

332001–332100 

|-bgcolor=#fefefe
| 332001 ||  || — || May 4, 2005 || Mount Lemmon || Mount Lemmon Survey || — || align=right data-sort-value="0.79" | 790 m || 
|-id=002 bgcolor=#E9E9E9
| 332002 ||  || — || June 1, 2005 || Kitt Peak || Spacewatch || MAR || align=right data-sort-value="0.97" | 970 m || 
|-id=003 bgcolor=#fefefe
| 332003 ||  || — || June 4, 2005 || Kitt Peak || Spacewatch || critical || align=right data-sort-value="0.68" | 680 m || 
|-id=004 bgcolor=#fefefe
| 332004 ||  || — || June 5, 2005 || Kitt Peak || Spacewatch || V || align=right data-sort-value="0.75" | 750 m || 
|-id=005 bgcolor=#fefefe
| 332005 ||  || — || June 6, 2005 || Kitt Peak || Spacewatch || — || align=right data-sort-value="0.78" | 780 m || 
|-id=006 bgcolor=#fefefe
| 332006 ||  || — || June 11, 2005 || Kitt Peak || Spacewatch || PHO || align=right | 1.2 km || 
|-id=007 bgcolor=#d6d6d6
| 332007 ||  || — || June 28, 2005 || Palomar || NEAT || ALA || align=right | 5.2 km || 
|-id=008 bgcolor=#fefefe
| 332008 ||  || — || June 30, 2005 || Socorro || LINEAR || PHO || align=right | 2.5 km || 
|-id=009 bgcolor=#fefefe
| 332009 ||  || — || June 27, 2005 || Kitt Peak || Spacewatch || MAS || align=right data-sort-value="0.61" | 610 m || 
|-id=010 bgcolor=#d6d6d6
| 332010 ||  || — || June 29, 2005 || Palomar || NEAT || 3:2 || align=right | 5.6 km || 
|-id=011 bgcolor=#fefefe
| 332011 ||  || — || June 30, 2005 || Kitt Peak || Spacewatch || — || align=right data-sort-value="0.92" | 920 m || 
|-id=012 bgcolor=#fefefe
| 332012 ||  || — || July 3, 2005 || Mount Lemmon || Mount Lemmon Survey || MAS || align=right data-sort-value="0.95" | 950 m || 
|-id=013 bgcolor=#fefefe
| 332013 ||  || — || July 3, 2005 || Mount Lemmon || Mount Lemmon Survey || MAS || align=right data-sort-value="0.68" | 680 m || 
|-id=014 bgcolor=#d6d6d6
| 332014 ||  || — || July 7, 2005 || Kitt Peak || Spacewatch || SHU3:2 || align=right | 5.4 km || 
|-id=015 bgcolor=#fefefe
| 332015 ||  || — || July 10, 2005 || Kitt Peak || Spacewatch || NYS || align=right data-sort-value="0.77" | 770 m || 
|-id=016 bgcolor=#fefefe
| 332016 ||  || — || July 2, 2005 || Kitt Peak || Spacewatch || NYS || align=right data-sort-value="0.89" | 890 m || 
|-id=017 bgcolor=#fefefe
| 332017 ||  || — || July 3, 2005 || Mount Lemmon || Mount Lemmon Survey || MAS || align=right data-sort-value="0.60" | 600 m || 
|-id=018 bgcolor=#fefefe
| 332018 ||  || — || July 6, 2005 || Campo Imperatore || CINEOS || MAS || align=right data-sort-value="0.79" | 790 m || 
|-id=019 bgcolor=#d6d6d6
| 332019 ||  || — || July 3, 2005 || Catalina || CSS || HIL3:2slow || align=right | 7.0 km || 
|-id=020 bgcolor=#fefefe
| 332020 ||  || — || July 8, 2005 || Kitt Peak || Spacewatch || V || align=right data-sort-value="0.82" | 820 m || 
|-id=021 bgcolor=#fefefe
| 332021 ||  || — || July 30, 2005 || Socorro || LINEAR || — || align=right | 3.1 km || 
|-id=022 bgcolor=#fefefe
| 332022 ||  || — || June 13, 2005 || Mount Lemmon || Mount Lemmon Survey || — || align=right data-sort-value="0.94" | 940 m || 
|-id=023 bgcolor=#fefefe
| 332023 ||  || — || July 31, 2005 || Socorro || LINEAR || PHO || align=right | 2.1 km || 
|-id=024 bgcolor=#fefefe
| 332024 ||  || — || July 30, 2005 || Campo Imperatore || CINEOS || — || align=right | 1.1 km || 
|-id=025 bgcolor=#fefefe
| 332025 ||  || — || July 29, 2005 || Anderson Mesa || LONEOS || — || align=right data-sort-value="0.98" | 980 m || 
|-id=026 bgcolor=#FA8072
| 332026 || 2005 PH || — || August 2, 2005 || Kingsnake || J. V. McClusky || — || align=right | 1.2 km || 
|-id=027 bgcolor=#FA8072
| 332027 ||  || — || August 2, 2005 || Socorro || LINEAR || — || align=right data-sort-value="0.98" | 980 m || 
|-id=028 bgcolor=#fefefe
| 332028 ||  || — || August 5, 2005 || Needville || Needville Obs. || MAS || align=right data-sort-value="0.69" | 690 m || 
|-id=029 bgcolor=#fefefe
| 332029 ||  || — || August 4, 2005 || Palomar || NEAT || — || align=right data-sort-value="0.81" | 810 m || 
|-id=030 bgcolor=#fefefe
| 332030 ||  || — || August 4, 2005 || Palomar || NEAT || MAS || align=right data-sort-value="0.87" | 870 m || 
|-id=031 bgcolor=#d6d6d6
| 332031 ||  || — || August 4, 2005 || Palomar || NEAT || 3:2 || align=right | 4.9 km || 
|-id=032 bgcolor=#fefefe
| 332032 ||  || — || August 9, 2005 || Marly || P. Kocher || FLO || align=right data-sort-value="0.76" | 760 m || 
|-id=033 bgcolor=#FA8072
| 332033 ||  || — || August 13, 2005 || Siding Spring || SSS || — || align=right | 1.3 km || 
|-id=034 bgcolor=#fefefe
| 332034 ||  || — || July 28, 2005 || Palomar || NEAT || V || align=right data-sort-value="0.61" | 610 m || 
|-id=035 bgcolor=#fefefe
| 332035 ||  || — || August 25, 2005 || Palomar || NEAT || NYS || align=right data-sort-value="0.84" | 840 m || 
|-id=036 bgcolor=#fefefe
| 332036 ||  || — || August 28, 2005 || Kitt Peak || Spacewatch || PHO || align=right | 1.4 km || 
|-id=037 bgcolor=#fefefe
| 332037 ||  || — || August 26, 2005 || Palomar || NEAT || — || align=right data-sort-value="0.73" | 730 m || 
|-id=038 bgcolor=#fefefe
| 332038 ||  || — || August 29, 2005 || Anderson Mesa || LONEOS || CHL || align=right | 3.4 km || 
|-id=039 bgcolor=#fefefe
| 332039 ||  || — || August 29, 2005 || Anderson Mesa || LONEOS || ERI || align=right | 2.2 km || 
|-id=040 bgcolor=#fefefe
| 332040 ||  || — || August 28, 2005 || Haleakala || NEAT || — || align=right | 1.1 km || 
|-id=041 bgcolor=#fefefe
| 332041 ||  || — || August 29, 2005 || Anderson Mesa || LONEOS || FLO || align=right data-sort-value="0.70" | 700 m || 
|-id=042 bgcolor=#fefefe
| 332042 ||  || — || August 22, 2005 || Palomar || NEAT || NYS || align=right data-sort-value="0.79" | 790 m || 
|-id=043 bgcolor=#d6d6d6
| 332043 ||  || — || August 27, 2005 || Palomar || NEAT || EOS || align=right | 2.3 km || 
|-id=044 bgcolor=#fefefe
| 332044 ||  || — || August 27, 2005 || Palomar || NEAT || — || align=right | 1.0 km || 
|-id=045 bgcolor=#fefefe
| 332045 ||  || — || August 27, 2005 || Palomar || NEAT || NYS || align=right data-sort-value="0.57" | 570 m || 
|-id=046 bgcolor=#fefefe
| 332046 ||  || — || August 28, 2005 || Kitt Peak || Spacewatch || — || align=right | 2.0 km || 
|-id=047 bgcolor=#fefefe
| 332047 ||  || — || August 28, 2005 || Siding Spring || SSS || — || align=right | 1.2 km || 
|-id=048 bgcolor=#fefefe
| 332048 ||  || — || August 30, 2005 || Palomar || NEAT || ERI || align=right | 1.8 km || 
|-id=049 bgcolor=#fefefe
| 332049 ||  || — || August 26, 2005 || Palomar || NEAT || NYS || align=right | 2.0 km || 
|-id=050 bgcolor=#fefefe
| 332050 ||  || — || August 31, 2005 || Anderson Mesa || LONEOS || — || align=right data-sort-value="0.99" | 990 m || 
|-id=051 bgcolor=#fefefe
| 332051 ||  || — || August 31, 2005 || Kitt Peak || Spacewatch || NYS || align=right data-sort-value="0.77" | 770 m || 
|-id=052 bgcolor=#fefefe
| 332052 ||  || — || August 31, 2005 || Palomar || NEAT || — || align=right | 1.0 km || 
|-id=053 bgcolor=#fefefe
| 332053 ||  || — || September 8, 2005 || Socorro || LINEAR || — || align=right data-sort-value="0.99" | 990 m || 
|-id=054 bgcolor=#fefefe
| 332054 ||  || — || September 10, 2005 || Anderson Mesa || LONEOS || — || align=right | 1.4 km || 
|-id=055 bgcolor=#fefefe
| 332055 ||  || — || September 13, 2005 || Anderson Mesa || LONEOS || PHO || align=right | 1.7 km || 
|-id=056 bgcolor=#FA8072
| 332056 ||  || — || September 13, 2005 || Socorro || LINEAR || — || align=right | 1.2 km || 
|-id=057 bgcolor=#fefefe
| 332057 ||  || — || September 23, 2005 || Catalina || CSS || NYS || align=right data-sort-value="0.73" | 730 m || 
|-id=058 bgcolor=#fefefe
| 332058 ||  || — || September 23, 2005 || Catalina || CSS || — || align=right | 1.7 km || 
|-id=059 bgcolor=#fefefe
| 332059 ||  || — || September 25, 2005 || Kitt Peak || Spacewatch || PHO || align=right | 1.7 km || 
|-id=060 bgcolor=#d6d6d6
| 332060 ||  || — || September 23, 2005 || Kitt Peak || Spacewatch || EOS || align=right | 2.4 km || 
|-id=061 bgcolor=#E9E9E9
| 332061 ||  || — || September 25, 2005 || Kitt Peak || Spacewatch || — || align=right data-sort-value="0.99" | 990 m || 
|-id=062 bgcolor=#fefefe
| 332062 ||  || — || September 26, 2005 || Palomar || NEAT || — || align=right | 1.3 km || 
|-id=063 bgcolor=#fefefe
| 332063 ||  || — || September 28, 2005 || Palomar || NEAT || — || align=right | 1.3 km || 
|-id=064 bgcolor=#fefefe
| 332064 ||  || — || September 25, 2005 || Kitt Peak || Spacewatch || — || align=right | 1.1 km || 
|-id=065 bgcolor=#E9E9E9
| 332065 ||  || — || September 25, 2005 || Kitt Peak || Spacewatch || — || align=right | 1.3 km || 
|-id=066 bgcolor=#fefefe
| 332066 ||  || — || September 26, 2005 || Kitt Peak || Spacewatch || MAS || align=right data-sort-value="0.61" | 610 m || 
|-id=067 bgcolor=#E9E9E9
| 332067 ||  || — || September 29, 2005 || Catalina || CSS || ADE || align=right | 4.0 km || 
|-id=068 bgcolor=#fefefe
| 332068 ||  || — || September 27, 2005 || Socorro || LINEAR || V || align=right data-sort-value="0.92" | 920 m || 
|-id=069 bgcolor=#E9E9E9
| 332069 ||  || — || September 29, 2005 || Kitt Peak || Spacewatch || — || align=right | 1.9 km || 
|-id=070 bgcolor=#fefefe
| 332070 ||  || — || September 30, 2005 || Kitt Peak || Spacewatch || V || align=right data-sort-value="0.65" | 650 m || 
|-id=071 bgcolor=#fefefe
| 332071 ||  || — || September 30, 2005 || Palomar || NEAT || — || align=right data-sort-value="0.73" | 730 m || 
|-id=072 bgcolor=#E9E9E9
| 332072 ||  || — || September 30, 2005 || Catalina || CSS || MAR || align=right | 1.5 km || 
|-id=073 bgcolor=#d6d6d6
| 332073 ||  || — || September 30, 2005 || Anderson Mesa || LONEOS || — || align=right | 4.1 km || 
|-id=074 bgcolor=#E9E9E9
| 332074 ||  || — || September 30, 2005 || Mount Lemmon || Mount Lemmon Survey || — || align=right | 1.5 km || 
|-id=075 bgcolor=#E9E9E9
| 332075 ||  || — || September 30, 2005 || Kitt Peak || Spacewatch || — || align=right | 1.1 km || 
|-id=076 bgcolor=#fefefe
| 332076 ||  || — || September 30, 2005 || Palomar || NEAT || — || align=right | 1.4 km || 
|-id=077 bgcolor=#fefefe
| 332077 ||  || — || September 22, 2005 || Palomar || NEAT || NYS || align=right data-sort-value="0.80" | 800 m || 
|-id=078 bgcolor=#E9E9E9
| 332078 ||  || — || October 1, 2005 || Mount Lemmon || Mount Lemmon Survey || — || align=right | 1.3 km || 
|-id=079 bgcolor=#FA8072
| 332079 ||  || — || October 1, 2005 || Mount Lemmon || Mount Lemmon Survey || — || align=right data-sort-value="0.66" | 660 m || 
|-id=080 bgcolor=#fefefe
| 332080 ||  || — || October 6, 2005 || Kitt Peak || Spacewatch || CLA || align=right | 1.8 km || 
|-id=081 bgcolor=#E9E9E9
| 332081 ||  || — || October 7, 2005 || Catalina || CSS || MAR || align=right data-sort-value="0.98" | 980 m || 
|-id=082 bgcolor=#fefefe
| 332082 ||  || — || October 8, 2005 || Kitt Peak || Spacewatch || — || align=right | 1.1 km || 
|-id=083 bgcolor=#fefefe
| 332083 ||  || — || October 10, 2005 || Anderson Mesa || LONEOS || — || align=right | 2.8 km || 
|-id=084 bgcolor=#E9E9E9
| 332084 Vasyakulbeda ||  ||  || October 29, 2005 || Andrushivka || Andrushivka Obs. || — || align=right | 3.2 km || 
|-id=085 bgcolor=#E9E9E9
| 332085 ||  || — || October 22, 2005 || Kitt Peak || Spacewatch || — || align=right | 2.7 km || 
|-id=086 bgcolor=#fefefe
| 332086 ||  || — || October 24, 2005 || Anderson Mesa || LONEOS || — || align=right data-sort-value="0.96" | 960 m || 
|-id=087 bgcolor=#fefefe
| 332087 ||  || — || October 23, 2005 || Catalina || CSS || — || align=right | 2.8 km || 
|-id=088 bgcolor=#E9E9E9
| 332088 ||  || — || October 25, 2005 || Catalina || CSS || KON || align=right | 2.5 km || 
|-id=089 bgcolor=#fefefe
| 332089 ||  || — || October 25, 2005 || Catalina || CSS || — || align=right | 1.1 km || 
|-id=090 bgcolor=#E9E9E9
| 332090 ||  || — || October 22, 2005 || Kitt Peak || Spacewatch || — || align=right | 1.3 km || 
|-id=091 bgcolor=#d6d6d6
| 332091 ||  || — || October 22, 2005 || Kitt Peak || Spacewatch || — || align=right | 3.8 km || 
|-id=092 bgcolor=#E9E9E9
| 332092 ||  || — || October 22, 2005 || Kitt Peak || Spacewatch || — || align=right | 2.8 km || 
|-id=093 bgcolor=#fefefe
| 332093 ||  || — || October 22, 2005 || Kitt Peak || Spacewatch || — || align=right data-sort-value="0.94" | 940 m || 
|-id=094 bgcolor=#E9E9E9
| 332094 ||  || — || October 24, 2005 || Kitt Peak || Spacewatch || — || align=right | 1.3 km || 
|-id=095 bgcolor=#E9E9E9
| 332095 ||  || — || October 25, 2005 || Mount Lemmon || Mount Lemmon Survey || — || align=right | 2.2 km || 
|-id=096 bgcolor=#E9E9E9
| 332096 ||  || — || October 26, 2005 || Kitt Peak || Spacewatch || — || align=right | 1.9 km || 
|-id=097 bgcolor=#E9E9E9
| 332097 ||  || — || October 26, 2005 || Anderson Mesa || LONEOS || — || align=right | 1.3 km || 
|-id=098 bgcolor=#E9E9E9
| 332098 ||  || — || October 27, 2005 || Kitt Peak || Spacewatch || — || align=right | 1.5 km || 
|-id=099 bgcolor=#E9E9E9
| 332099 ||  || — || October 24, 2005 || Kitt Peak || Spacewatch || — || align=right | 2.6 km || 
|-id=100 bgcolor=#E9E9E9
| 332100 ||  || — || October 24, 2005 || Kitt Peak || Spacewatch || — || align=right | 1.2 km || 
|}

332101–332200 

|-bgcolor=#d6d6d6
| 332101 ||  || — || October 25, 2005 || Kitt Peak || Spacewatch || — || align=right | 3.9 km || 
|-id=102 bgcolor=#E9E9E9
| 332102 ||  || — || October 27, 2005 || Kitt Peak || Spacewatch || — || align=right data-sort-value="0.94" | 940 m || 
|-id=103 bgcolor=#E9E9E9
| 332103 ||  || — || October 25, 2005 || Kitt Peak || Spacewatch || — || align=right | 2.4 km || 
|-id=104 bgcolor=#fefefe
| 332104 ||  || — || October 25, 2005 || Kitt Peak || Spacewatch || — || align=right | 1.1 km || 
|-id=105 bgcolor=#E9E9E9
| 332105 ||  || — || October 25, 2005 || Kitt Peak || Spacewatch || — || align=right | 1.2 km || 
|-id=106 bgcolor=#E9E9E9
| 332106 ||  || — || October 27, 2005 || Kitt Peak || Spacewatch || — || align=right | 1.1 km || 
|-id=107 bgcolor=#E9E9E9
| 332107 ||  || — || October 28, 2005 || Kitt Peak || Spacewatch || — || align=right | 1.3 km || 
|-id=108 bgcolor=#E9E9E9
| 332108 ||  || — || October 26, 2005 || Kitt Peak || Spacewatch || ADE || align=right | 2.3 km || 
|-id=109 bgcolor=#E9E9E9
| 332109 ||  || — || October 26, 2005 || Kitt Peak || Spacewatch || — || align=right | 1.8 km || 
|-id=110 bgcolor=#fefefe
| 332110 ||  || — || October 28, 2005 || Catalina || CSS || — || align=right | 1.0 km || 
|-id=111 bgcolor=#fefefe
| 332111 ||  || — || October 28, 2005 || Catalina || CSS || ERI || align=right | 1.7 km || 
|-id=112 bgcolor=#E9E9E9
| 332112 ||  || — || October 27, 2005 || Kitt Peak || Spacewatch || — || align=right | 1.1 km || 
|-id=113 bgcolor=#E9E9E9
| 332113 ||  || — || October 28, 2005 || Kitt Peak || Spacewatch || — || align=right data-sort-value="0.87" | 870 m || 
|-id=114 bgcolor=#E9E9E9
| 332114 ||  || — || October 28, 2005 || Kitt Peak || Spacewatch || — || align=right data-sort-value="0.92" | 920 m || 
|-id=115 bgcolor=#E9E9E9
| 332115 ||  || — || October 28, 2005 || Kitt Peak || Spacewatch || — || align=right | 3.5 km || 
|-id=116 bgcolor=#E9E9E9
| 332116 ||  || — || October 28, 2005 || Socorro || LINEAR || MAR || align=right | 1.6 km || 
|-id=117 bgcolor=#E9E9E9
| 332117 ||  || — || October 22, 2005 || Catalina || CSS || — || align=right | 1.9 km || 
|-id=118 bgcolor=#fefefe
| 332118 ||  || — || October 29, 2005 || Catalina || CSS || — || align=right | 1.3 km || 
|-id=119 bgcolor=#E9E9E9
| 332119 ||  || — || October 29, 2005 || Palomar || NEAT || — || align=right | 1.2 km || 
|-id=120 bgcolor=#d6d6d6
| 332120 ||  || — || June 9, 1997 || Kitt Peak || Spacewatch || — || align=right | 4.3 km || 
|-id=121 bgcolor=#E9E9E9
| 332121 ||  || — || November 2, 2005 || Mount Lemmon || Mount Lemmon Survey || — || align=right | 1.1 km || 
|-id=122 bgcolor=#d6d6d6
| 332122 ||  || — || November 3, 2005 || Mount Lemmon || Mount Lemmon Survey || — || align=right | 3.3 km || 
|-id=123 bgcolor=#E9E9E9
| 332123 ||  || — || November 1, 2005 || Mount Lemmon || Mount Lemmon Survey || — || align=right data-sort-value="0.95" | 950 m || 
|-id=124 bgcolor=#E9E9E9
| 332124 ||  || — || November 3, 2005 || Mount Lemmon || Mount Lemmon Survey || — || align=right | 4.0 km || 
|-id=125 bgcolor=#E9E9E9
| 332125 ||  || — || November 22, 2005 || Kitt Peak || Spacewatch || — || align=right | 1.3 km || 
|-id=126 bgcolor=#E9E9E9
| 332126 ||  || — || November 24, 2005 || Palomar || NEAT || — || align=right | 1.1 km || 
|-id=127 bgcolor=#E9E9E9
| 332127 ||  || — || November 21, 2005 || Kitt Peak || Spacewatch || — || align=right | 2.5 km || 
|-id=128 bgcolor=#d6d6d6
| 332128 ||  || — || November 22, 2005 || Kitt Peak || Spacewatch || — || align=right | 3.3 km || 
|-id=129 bgcolor=#FA8072
| 332129 ||  || — || November 24, 2005 || Palomar || NEAT || H || align=right data-sort-value="0.89" | 890 m || 
|-id=130 bgcolor=#fefefe
| 332130 ||  || — || October 30, 2005 || Catalina || CSS || H || align=right data-sort-value="0.81" | 810 m || 
|-id=131 bgcolor=#E9E9E9
| 332131 ||  || — || November 28, 2005 || Mount Lemmon || Mount Lemmon Survey || — || align=right | 1.3 km || 
|-id=132 bgcolor=#E9E9E9
| 332132 ||  || — || November 25, 2005 || Mount Lemmon || Mount Lemmon Survey || — || align=right | 1.5 km || 
|-id=133 bgcolor=#E9E9E9
| 332133 ||  || — || November 29, 2005 || Socorro || LINEAR || — || align=right | 3.1 km || 
|-id=134 bgcolor=#E9E9E9
| 332134 ||  || — || November 26, 2005 || Mount Lemmon || Mount Lemmon Survey || — || align=right | 3.2 km || 
|-id=135 bgcolor=#E9E9E9
| 332135 ||  || — || November 28, 2005 || Catalina || CSS || — || align=right | 2.2 km || 
|-id=136 bgcolor=#FA8072
| 332136 ||  || — || November 30, 2005 || Kitt Peak || Spacewatch || — || align=right data-sort-value="0.90" | 900 m || 
|-id=137 bgcolor=#E9E9E9
| 332137 ||  || — || November 26, 2005 || Kitt Peak || Spacewatch || — || align=right | 1.5 km || 
|-id=138 bgcolor=#E9E9E9
| 332138 ||  || — || November 24, 2005 || Palomar || NEAT || — || align=right | 1.7 km || 
|-id=139 bgcolor=#E9E9E9
| 332139 ||  || — || November 25, 2005 || Palomar || NEAT || BRU || align=right | 3.6 km || 
|-id=140 bgcolor=#E9E9E9
| 332140 ||  || — || September 30, 2005 || Mount Lemmon || Mount Lemmon Survey || HOF || align=right | 3.2 km || 
|-id=141 bgcolor=#E9E9E9
| 332141 ||  || — || November 30, 2005 || Kitt Peak || Spacewatch || — || align=right | 2.8 km || 
|-id=142 bgcolor=#E9E9E9
| 332142 ||  || — || November 30, 2005 || Kitt Peak || Spacewatch || — || align=right | 2.6 km || 
|-id=143 bgcolor=#E9E9E9
| 332143 ||  || — || December 4, 2005 || Socorro || LINEAR || HNS || align=right | 1.4 km || 
|-id=144 bgcolor=#E9E9E9
| 332144 ||  || — || December 4, 2005 || Kitt Peak || Spacewatch || — || align=right | 1.4 km || 
|-id=145 bgcolor=#E9E9E9
| 332145 ||  || — || December 2, 2005 || Kitt Peak || Spacewatch || — || align=right | 1.4 km || 
|-id=146 bgcolor=#E9E9E9
| 332146 ||  || — || December 4, 2005 || Kitt Peak || Spacewatch || — || align=right | 1.2 km || 
|-id=147 bgcolor=#E9E9E9
| 332147 ||  || — || December 6, 2005 || Kitt Peak || Spacewatch || — || align=right | 1.4 km || 
|-id=148 bgcolor=#E9E9E9
| 332148 ||  || — || December 10, 2005 || Socorro || LINEAR || — || align=right | 1.8 km || 
|-id=149 bgcolor=#E9E9E9
| 332149 ||  || — || December 22, 2005 || Kitt Peak || Spacewatch || — || align=right | 2.1 km || 
|-id=150 bgcolor=#E9E9E9
| 332150 ||  || — || December 25, 2005 || Kitt Peak || Spacewatch || — || align=right | 2.2 km || 
|-id=151 bgcolor=#fefefe
| 332151 ||  || — || December 22, 2005 || Catalina || CSS || H || align=right data-sort-value="0.62" | 620 m || 
|-id=152 bgcolor=#E9E9E9
| 332152 ||  || — || November 16, 2000 || Kitt Peak || Spacewatch || AGN || align=right | 1.4 km || 
|-id=153 bgcolor=#fefefe
| 332153 ||  || — || December 24, 2005 || Kitt Peak || Spacewatch || H || align=right data-sort-value="0.73" | 730 m || 
|-id=154 bgcolor=#E9E9E9
| 332154 ||  || — || December 24, 2005 || Kitt Peak || Spacewatch || — || align=right | 1.1 km || 
|-id=155 bgcolor=#E9E9E9
| 332155 ||  || — || December 25, 2005 || Kitt Peak || Spacewatch || — || align=right | 1.2 km || 
|-id=156 bgcolor=#E9E9E9
| 332156 ||  || — || December 25, 2005 || Kitt Peak || Spacewatch || — || align=right | 2.4 km || 
|-id=157 bgcolor=#E9E9E9
| 332157 ||  || — || December 26, 2005 || Kitt Peak || Spacewatch || — || align=right | 2.7 km || 
|-id=158 bgcolor=#E9E9E9
| 332158 ||  || — || December 27, 2005 || Mount Lemmon || Mount Lemmon Survey || — || align=right | 1.5 km || 
|-id=159 bgcolor=#E9E9E9
| 332159 ||  || — || October 7, 2004 || Kitt Peak || Spacewatch || NEM || align=right | 2.6 km || 
|-id=160 bgcolor=#d6d6d6
| 332160 ||  || — || December 22, 2005 || Catalina || CSS || BRA || align=right | 1.9 km || 
|-id=161 bgcolor=#E9E9E9
| 332161 ||  || — || December 30, 2005 || Socorro || LINEAR || — || align=right | 2.3 km || 
|-id=162 bgcolor=#E9E9E9
| 332162 ||  || — || December 25, 2005 || Mount Lemmon || Mount Lemmon Survey || — || align=right | 2.9 km || 
|-id=163 bgcolor=#d6d6d6
| 332163 ||  || — || December 27, 2005 || Kitt Peak || Spacewatch || KAR || align=right | 1.4 km || 
|-id=164 bgcolor=#fefefe
| 332164 ||  || — || December 30, 2005 || Kitt Peak || Spacewatch || H || align=right data-sort-value="0.74" | 740 m || 
|-id=165 bgcolor=#E9E9E9
| 332165 ||  || — || December 1, 2005 || Kitt Peak || Spacewatch || — || align=right | 2.4 km || 
|-id=166 bgcolor=#fefefe
| 332166 ||  || — || December 25, 2005 || Mount Lemmon || Mount Lemmon Survey || H || align=right | 1.1 km || 
|-id=167 bgcolor=#E9E9E9
| 332167 ||  || — || December 25, 2005 || Mount Lemmon || Mount Lemmon Survey || — || align=right | 2.4 km || 
|-id=168 bgcolor=#E9E9E9
| 332168 ||  || — || December 29, 2005 || Mount Lemmon || Mount Lemmon Survey || — || align=right | 1.9 km || 
|-id=169 bgcolor=#E9E9E9
| 332169 ||  || — || January 2, 2006 || Catalina || CSS || — || align=right | 4.6 km || 
|-id=170 bgcolor=#E9E9E9
| 332170 ||  || — || January 5, 2006 || Mount Lemmon || Mount Lemmon Survey || — || align=right | 1.7 km || 
|-id=171 bgcolor=#E9E9E9
| 332171 ||  || — || January 7, 2006 || Mount Lemmon || Mount Lemmon Survey || AGN || align=right | 1.1 km || 
|-id=172 bgcolor=#E9E9E9
| 332172 ||  || — || January 7, 2006 || Mount Lemmon || Mount Lemmon Survey || — || align=right | 2.2 km || 
|-id=173 bgcolor=#E9E9E9
| 332173 ||  || — || January 6, 2006 || Kitt Peak || Spacewatch || — || align=right | 2.6 km || 
|-id=174 bgcolor=#d6d6d6
| 332174 ||  || — || January 23, 2006 || Mount Lemmon || Mount Lemmon Survey || KOR || align=right | 1.5 km || 
|-id=175 bgcolor=#d6d6d6
| 332175 ||  || — || January 23, 2006 || Mount Lemmon || Mount Lemmon Survey || THM || align=right | 2.0 km || 
|-id=176 bgcolor=#d6d6d6
| 332176 ||  || — || January 7, 2006 || Mount Lemmon || Mount Lemmon Survey || — || align=right | 2.6 km || 
|-id=177 bgcolor=#E9E9E9
| 332177 ||  || — || October 2, 2000 || Anderson Mesa || LONEOS || — || align=right | 1.0 km || 
|-id=178 bgcolor=#fefefe
| 332178 ||  || — || January 26, 2006 || Kitt Peak || Spacewatch || — || align=right data-sort-value="0.67" | 670 m || 
|-id=179 bgcolor=#E9E9E9
| 332179 ||  || — || January 25, 2006 || Kitt Peak || Spacewatch || — || align=right | 2.3 km || 
|-id=180 bgcolor=#d6d6d6
| 332180 ||  || — || January 25, 2006 || Kitt Peak || Spacewatch || — || align=right | 4.2 km || 
|-id=181 bgcolor=#d6d6d6
| 332181 ||  || — || January 26, 2006 || Kitt Peak || Spacewatch || KOR || align=right | 1.5 km || 
|-id=182 bgcolor=#E9E9E9
| 332182 ||  || — || January 23, 2006 || Socorro || LINEAR || EUN || align=right | 1.8 km || 
|-id=183 bgcolor=#E9E9E9
| 332183 Jaroussky ||  ||  || January 28, 2006 || Nogales || J.-C. Merlin || — || align=right | 3.1 km || 
|-id=184 bgcolor=#d6d6d6
| 332184 ||  || — || January 30, 2006 || Kitt Peak || Spacewatch || — || align=right | 3.9 km || 
|-id=185 bgcolor=#E9E9E9
| 332185 ||  || — || January 23, 2006 || Catalina || CSS || — || align=right | 3.9 km || 
|-id=186 bgcolor=#E9E9E9
| 332186 ||  || — || January 23, 2006 || Mount Lemmon || Mount Lemmon Survey || WIT || align=right | 1.2 km || 
|-id=187 bgcolor=#E9E9E9
| 332187 ||  || — || January 31, 2006 || Kitt Peak || Spacewatch || — || align=right | 2.0 km || 
|-id=188 bgcolor=#E9E9E9
| 332188 ||  || — || January 31, 2006 || Kitt Peak || Spacewatch || — || align=right | 1.00 km || 
|-id=189 bgcolor=#E9E9E9
| 332189 ||  || — || January 31, 2006 || Kitt Peak || Spacewatch || HEN || align=right | 1.3 km || 
|-id=190 bgcolor=#E9E9E9
| 332190 ||  || — || January 27, 2006 || Kitt Peak || Spacewatch || NEMslow || align=right | 2.9 km || 
|-id=191 bgcolor=#E9E9E9
| 332191 ||  || — || February 2, 2006 || Kitt Peak || Spacewatch || — || align=right | 2.7 km || 
|-id=192 bgcolor=#E9E9E9
| 332192 ||  || — || February 3, 2006 || Kitt Peak || Spacewatch || — || align=right | 1.7 km || 
|-id=193 bgcolor=#d6d6d6
| 332193 ||  || — || February 20, 2006 || Kitt Peak || Spacewatch || — || align=right | 2.8 km || 
|-id=194 bgcolor=#E9E9E9
| 332194 ||  || — || February 22, 2006 || Catalina || CSS || HOF || align=right | 4.1 km || 
|-id=195 bgcolor=#E9E9E9
| 332195 ||  || — || February 24, 2006 || Mount Lemmon || Mount Lemmon Survey || NEM || align=right | 2.5 km || 
|-id=196 bgcolor=#E9E9E9
| 332196 ||  || — || October 31, 2005 || Mauna Kea || A. Boattini || PAD || align=right | 1.7 km || 
|-id=197 bgcolor=#d6d6d6
| 332197 ||  || — || February 24, 2006 || Kitt Peak || Spacewatch || — || align=right | 3.0 km || 
|-id=198 bgcolor=#fefefe
| 332198 ||  || — || February 25, 2006 || Kitt Peak || Spacewatch || FLO || align=right data-sort-value="0.65" | 650 m || 
|-id=199 bgcolor=#d6d6d6
| 332199 ||  || — || November 9, 2004 || Catalina || CSS || — || align=right | 3.6 km || 
|-id=200 bgcolor=#d6d6d6
| 332200 ||  || — || February 27, 2006 || Kitt Peak || Spacewatch || THM || align=right | 2.1 km || 
|}

332201–332300 

|-bgcolor=#d6d6d6
| 332201 ||  || — || February 25, 2006 || Kitt Peak || Spacewatch || — || align=right | 4.6 km || 
|-id=202 bgcolor=#d6d6d6
| 332202 ||  || — || February 27, 2006 || Kitt Peak || Spacewatch || — || align=right | 2.7 km || 
|-id=203 bgcolor=#E9E9E9
| 332203 ||  || — || February 24, 2006 || Catalina || CSS || — || align=right | 3.6 km || 
|-id=204 bgcolor=#d6d6d6
| 332204 ||  || — || March 2, 2006 || Kitt Peak || Spacewatch || — || align=right | 2.9 km || 
|-id=205 bgcolor=#d6d6d6
| 332205 ||  || — || March 2, 2006 || Mount Lemmon || Mount Lemmon Survey || THM || align=right | 2.2 km || 
|-id=206 bgcolor=#E9E9E9
| 332206 ||  || — || March 3, 2006 || Kitt Peak || Spacewatch || GEF || align=right | 1.5 km || 
|-id=207 bgcolor=#d6d6d6
| 332207 ||  || — || March 5, 2006 || Kitt Peak || Spacewatch || EOS || align=right | 1.7 km || 
|-id=208 bgcolor=#d6d6d6
| 332208 ||  || — || March 2, 2006 || Catalina || CSS || EUP || align=right | 4.2 km || 
|-id=209 bgcolor=#d6d6d6
| 332209 ||  || — || March 23, 2006 || Kitt Peak || Spacewatch || — || align=right | 3.8 km || 
|-id=210 bgcolor=#d6d6d6
| 332210 ||  || — || March 23, 2006 || Catalina || CSS || — || align=right | 2.9 km || 
|-id=211 bgcolor=#d6d6d6
| 332211 ||  || — || March 23, 2006 || Mount Lemmon || Mount Lemmon Survey || — || align=right | 3.4 km || 
|-id=212 bgcolor=#d6d6d6
| 332212 ||  || — || March 24, 2006 || Mount Lemmon || Mount Lemmon Survey || — || align=right | 3.5 km || 
|-id=213 bgcolor=#fefefe
| 332213 ||  || — || March 9, 2006 || Mount Lemmon || Mount Lemmon Survey || NYS || align=right data-sort-value="0.83" | 830 m || 
|-id=214 bgcolor=#d6d6d6
| 332214 ||  || — || March 25, 2006 || Kitt Peak || Spacewatch || — || align=right | 4.4 km || 
|-id=215 bgcolor=#d6d6d6
| 332215 ||  || — || April 1, 2006 || Eskridge || Farpoint Obs. || — || align=right | 3.4 km || 
|-id=216 bgcolor=#d6d6d6
| 332216 ||  || — || April 2, 2006 || Kitt Peak || Spacewatch || — || align=right | 3.1 km || 
|-id=217 bgcolor=#d6d6d6
| 332217 ||  || — || March 23, 2006 || Kitt Peak || Spacewatch || — || align=right | 3.3 km || 
|-id=218 bgcolor=#d6d6d6
| 332218 ||  || — || April 7, 2006 || Catalina || CSS || — || align=right | 4.1 km || 
|-id=219 bgcolor=#d6d6d6
| 332219 ||  || — || April 2, 2006 || Kitt Peak || Spacewatch || — || align=right | 7.6 km || 
|-id=220 bgcolor=#d6d6d6
| 332220 ||  || — || April 9, 2006 || Kitt Peak || Spacewatch || — || align=right | 3.8 km || 
|-id=221 bgcolor=#d6d6d6
| 332221 ||  || — || October 25, 2003 || Kitt Peak || Spacewatch || — || align=right | 3.9 km || 
|-id=222 bgcolor=#d6d6d6
| 332222 ||  || — || April 2, 2006 || Anderson Mesa || LONEOS || — || align=right | 4.7 km || 
|-id=223 bgcolor=#d6d6d6
| 332223 ||  || — || April 7, 2006 || Kitt Peak || Spacewatch || THM || align=right | 2.1 km || 
|-id=224 bgcolor=#E9E9E9
| 332224 ||  || — || April 2, 2006 || Kitt Peak || Spacewatch || — || align=right | 2.1 km || 
|-id=225 bgcolor=#d6d6d6
| 332225 ||  || — || April 19, 2006 || Mount Lemmon || Mount Lemmon Survey || ALA || align=right | 2.9 km || 
|-id=226 bgcolor=#d6d6d6
| 332226 ||  || — || April 21, 2006 || Kitt Peak || Spacewatch || MEL || align=right | 3.5 km || 
|-id=227 bgcolor=#d6d6d6
| 332227 ||  || — || April 23, 2006 || Socorro || LINEAR || EUP || align=right | 6.2 km || 
|-id=228 bgcolor=#d6d6d6
| 332228 ||  || — || April 25, 2006 || Kitt Peak || Spacewatch || — || align=right | 4.0 km || 
|-id=229 bgcolor=#d6d6d6
| 332229 ||  || — || March 25, 2006 || Jarnac || Jarnac Obs. || — || align=right | 3.2 km || 
|-id=230 bgcolor=#d6d6d6
| 332230 ||  || — || April 23, 2006 || Socorro || LINEAR || — || align=right | 3.7 km || 
|-id=231 bgcolor=#d6d6d6
| 332231 ||  || — || April 25, 2006 || Kitt Peak || Spacewatch || Tj (2.9) || align=right | 4.4 km || 
|-id=232 bgcolor=#d6d6d6
| 332232 ||  || — || April 26, 2006 || Kitt Peak || Spacewatch || — || align=right | 3.6 km || 
|-id=233 bgcolor=#d6d6d6
| 332233 ||  || — || April 30, 2006 || Kitt Peak || Spacewatch || critical || align=right | 2.7 km || 
|-id=234 bgcolor=#E9E9E9
| 332234 ||  || — || September 18, 2003 || Kitt Peak || Spacewatch || — || align=right data-sort-value="0.90" | 900 m || 
|-id=235 bgcolor=#d6d6d6
| 332235 ||  || — || April 21, 2006 || Kitt Peak || Spacewatch || — || align=right | 3.4 km || 
|-id=236 bgcolor=#d6d6d6
| 332236 ||  || — || May 2, 2006 || Kitt Peak || Spacewatch || VER || align=right | 3.5 km || 
|-id=237 bgcolor=#d6d6d6
| 332237 ||  || — || May 6, 2006 || Mount Lemmon || Mount Lemmon Survey || — || align=right | 3.2 km || 
|-id=238 bgcolor=#fefefe
| 332238 ||  || — || August 22, 2003 || Campo Imperatore || CINEOS || — || align=right | 1.3 km || 
|-id=239 bgcolor=#d6d6d6
| 332239 ||  || — || May 10, 2006 || Palomar || NEAT || — || align=right | 3.5 km || 
|-id=240 bgcolor=#d6d6d6
| 332240 ||  || — || May 19, 2006 || Mount Lemmon || Mount Lemmon Survey || — || align=right | 4.0 km || 
|-id=241 bgcolor=#d6d6d6
| 332241 ||  || — || May 20, 2006 || Kitt Peak || Spacewatch || — || align=right | 4.3 km || 
|-id=242 bgcolor=#d6d6d6
| 332242 ||  || — || May 20, 2006 || Kitt Peak || Spacewatch || CRO || align=right | 5.5 km || 
|-id=243 bgcolor=#d6d6d6
| 332243 ||  || — || May 20, 2006 || Kitt Peak || Spacewatch || THM || align=right | 2.5 km || 
|-id=244 bgcolor=#d6d6d6
| 332244 ||  || — || May 20, 2006 || Kitt Peak || Spacewatch || THM || align=right | 2.7 km || 
|-id=245 bgcolor=#d6d6d6
| 332245 ||  || — || May 20, 2006 || Kitt Peak || Spacewatch || — || align=right | 4.1 km || 
|-id=246 bgcolor=#d6d6d6
| 332246 ||  || — || May 21, 2006 || Mount Lemmon || Mount Lemmon Survey || — || align=right | 6.1 km || 
|-id=247 bgcolor=#d6d6d6
| 332247 ||  || — || May 21, 2006 || Kitt Peak || Spacewatch || — || align=right | 4.6 km || 
|-id=248 bgcolor=#d6d6d6
| 332248 ||  || — || May 21, 2006 || Kitt Peak || Spacewatch || — || align=right | 3.6 km || 
|-id=249 bgcolor=#d6d6d6
| 332249 ||  || — || May 20, 2006 || Catalina || CSS || — || align=right | 5.7 km || 
|-id=250 bgcolor=#d6d6d6
| 332250 ||  || — || May 24, 2006 || Kitt Peak || Spacewatch || URS || align=right | 5.7 km || 
|-id=251 bgcolor=#d6d6d6
| 332251 ||  || — || May 27, 2006 || Kitt Peak || Spacewatch || — || align=right | 3.3 km || 
|-id=252 bgcolor=#d6d6d6
| 332252 ||  || — || May 30, 2006 || Reedy Creek || J. Broughton || — || align=right | 6.0 km || 
|-id=253 bgcolor=#E9E9E9
| 332253 ||  || — || May 31, 2006 || Mount Lemmon || Mount Lemmon Survey || — || align=right data-sort-value="0.94" | 940 m || 
|-id=254 bgcolor=#d6d6d6
| 332254 ||  || — || June 18, 2006 || Palomar || NEAT || — || align=right | 4.6 km || 
|-id=255 bgcolor=#d6d6d6
| 332255 ||  || — || June 19, 2006 || Mount Lemmon || Mount Lemmon Survey || Tj (2.97) || align=right | 8.2 km || 
|-id=256 bgcolor=#d6d6d6
| 332256 ||  || — || June 19, 2006 || Kitt Peak || Spacewatch || URS || align=right | 4.4 km || 
|-id=257 bgcolor=#fefefe
| 332257 ||  || — || August 20, 2006 || Kitt Peak || Spacewatch || — || align=right data-sort-value="0.69" | 690 m || 
|-id=258 bgcolor=#fefefe
| 332258 ||  || — || August 19, 2006 || Kitt Peak || Spacewatch || — || align=right data-sort-value="0.50" | 500 m || 
|-id=259 bgcolor=#fefefe
| 332259 ||  || — || August 21, 2006 || Kitt Peak || Spacewatch || FLO || align=right data-sort-value="0.58" | 580 m || 
|-id=260 bgcolor=#fefefe
| 332260 ||  || — || August 24, 2006 || Socorro || LINEAR || — || align=right | 1.2 km || 
|-id=261 bgcolor=#fefefe
| 332261 ||  || — || September 14, 2006 || Palomar || NEAT || — || align=right data-sort-value="0.93" | 930 m || 
|-id=262 bgcolor=#d6d6d6
| 332262 ||  || — || September 12, 2006 || Catalina || CSS || SHU3:2 || align=right | 6.4 km || 
|-id=263 bgcolor=#fefefe
| 332263 ||  || — || September 14, 2006 || Catalina || CSS || — || align=right data-sort-value="0.78" | 780 m || 
|-id=264 bgcolor=#fefefe
| 332264 ||  || — || July 21, 2006 || Mount Lemmon || Mount Lemmon Survey || — || align=right data-sort-value="0.81" | 810 m || 
|-id=265 bgcolor=#fefefe
| 332265 ||  || — || September 15, 2006 || Kitt Peak || Spacewatch || — || align=right data-sort-value="0.61" | 610 m || 
|-id=266 bgcolor=#fefefe
| 332266 ||  || — || September 15, 2006 || Kitt Peak || Spacewatch || V || align=right data-sort-value="0.69" | 690 m || 
|-id=267 bgcolor=#fefefe
| 332267 ||  || — || September 14, 2006 || Kitt Peak || Spacewatch || — || align=right data-sort-value="0.79" | 790 m || 
|-id=268 bgcolor=#fefefe
| 332268 ||  || — || September 17, 2006 || Catalina || CSS || — || align=right data-sort-value="0.89" | 890 m || 
|-id=269 bgcolor=#fefefe
| 332269 ||  || — || September 18, 2006 || Catalina || CSS || — || align=right | 1.1 km || 
|-id=270 bgcolor=#fefefe
| 332270 ||  || — || September 17, 2006 || Kitt Peak || Spacewatch || — || align=right data-sort-value="0.67" | 670 m || 
|-id=271 bgcolor=#fefefe
| 332271 ||  || — || September 18, 2006 || Catalina || CSS || — || align=right data-sort-value="0.72" | 720 m || 
|-id=272 bgcolor=#fefefe
| 332272 ||  || — || September 19, 2006 || Kitt Peak || Spacewatch || FLO || align=right data-sort-value="0.62" | 620 m || 
|-id=273 bgcolor=#fefefe
| 332273 ||  || — || September 19, 2006 || Kitt Peak || Spacewatch || — || align=right data-sort-value="0.98" | 980 m || 
|-id=274 bgcolor=#fefefe
| 332274 ||  || — || September 19, 2006 || Kitt Peak || Spacewatch || — || align=right data-sort-value="0.80" | 800 m || 
|-id=275 bgcolor=#d6d6d6
| 332275 ||  || — || September 25, 2006 || Anderson Mesa || LONEOS || HIL3:2 || align=right | 7.3 km || 
|-id=276 bgcolor=#fefefe
| 332276 ||  || — || September 24, 2006 || Kitt Peak || Spacewatch || FLO || align=right data-sort-value="0.48" | 480 m || 
|-id=277 bgcolor=#fefefe
| 332277 ||  || — || September 27, 2006 || Socorro || LINEAR || FLO || align=right data-sort-value="0.74" | 740 m || 
|-id=278 bgcolor=#d6d6d6
| 332278 ||  || — || September 25, 2006 || Mount Lemmon || Mount Lemmon Survey || — || align=right | 2.1 km || 
|-id=279 bgcolor=#fefefe
| 332279 ||  || — || September 19, 2006 || Catalina || CSS || FLO || align=right data-sort-value="0.57" | 570 m || 
|-id=280 bgcolor=#fefefe
| 332280 ||  || — || September 27, 2006 || Kitt Peak || Spacewatch || — || align=right data-sort-value="0.61" | 610 m || 
|-id=281 bgcolor=#fefefe
| 332281 ||  || — || September 27, 2006 || Kitt Peak || Spacewatch || — || align=right data-sort-value="0.73" | 730 m || 
|-id=282 bgcolor=#d6d6d6
| 332282 ||  || — || September 28, 2006 || Kitt Peak || Spacewatch || CHA || align=right | 1.9 km || 
|-id=283 bgcolor=#fefefe
| 332283 ||  || — || September 30, 2006 || Catalina || CSS || FLO || align=right data-sort-value="0.75" | 750 m || 
|-id=284 bgcolor=#fefefe
| 332284 ||  || — || September 30, 2006 || Mount Lemmon || Mount Lemmon Survey || V || align=right data-sort-value="0.61" | 610 m || 
|-id=285 bgcolor=#FA8072
| 332285 ||  || — || September 19, 2006 || Catalina || CSS || — || align=right data-sort-value="0.85" | 850 m || 
|-id=286 bgcolor=#fefefe
| 332286 || 2006 TT || — || October 1, 2006 || Piszkéstető || K. Sárneczky || — || align=right data-sort-value="0.74" | 740 m || 
|-id=287 bgcolor=#fefefe
| 332287 ||  || — || October 2, 2006 || Mount Lemmon || Mount Lemmon Survey || FLO || align=right data-sort-value="0.53" | 530 m || 
|-id=288 bgcolor=#d6d6d6
| 332288 ||  || — || October 11, 2006 || Kitt Peak || Spacewatch || SHU3:2 || align=right | 8.7 km || 
|-id=289 bgcolor=#fefefe
| 332289 ||  || — || September 25, 2006 || Kitt Peak || Spacewatch || — || align=right data-sort-value="0.91" | 910 m || 
|-id=290 bgcolor=#fefefe
| 332290 ||  || — || October 12, 2006 || Kitt Peak || Spacewatch || — || align=right | 1.3 km || 
|-id=291 bgcolor=#fefefe
| 332291 ||  || — || October 13, 2006 || Kitt Peak || Spacewatch || V || align=right data-sort-value="0.77" | 770 m || 
|-id=292 bgcolor=#fefefe
| 332292 ||  || — || October 13, 2006 || Kitt Peak || Spacewatch || — || align=right data-sort-value="0.83" | 830 m || 
|-id=293 bgcolor=#fefefe
| 332293 ||  || — || October 12, 2006 || Palomar || NEAT || — || align=right data-sort-value="0.94" | 940 m || 
|-id=294 bgcolor=#d6d6d6
| 332294 ||  || — || October 17, 2006 || Mount Lemmon || Mount Lemmon Survey || HIL3:2 || align=right | 5.4 km || 
|-id=295 bgcolor=#fefefe
| 332295 ||  || — || October 16, 2006 || Kitt Peak || Spacewatch || — || align=right | 1.1 km || 
|-id=296 bgcolor=#d6d6d6
| 332296 ||  || — || September 30, 2006 || Mount Lemmon || Mount Lemmon Survey || SHU3:2 || align=right | 6.5 km || 
|-id=297 bgcolor=#E9E9E9
| 332297 ||  || — || October 18, 2006 || Kitt Peak || Spacewatch || — || align=right | 1.7 km || 
|-id=298 bgcolor=#fefefe
| 332298 ||  || — || October 21, 2006 || Mount Lemmon || Mount Lemmon Survey || V || align=right data-sort-value="0.62" | 620 m || 
|-id=299 bgcolor=#fefefe
| 332299 ||  || — || September 17, 2006 || Catalina || CSS || — || align=right data-sort-value="0.99" | 990 m || 
|-id=300 bgcolor=#E9E9E9
| 332300 ||  || — || October 31, 2006 || Catalina || CSS || BAR || align=right | 2.4 km || 
|}

332301–332400 

|-bgcolor=#fefefe
| 332301 ||  || — || October 27, 2006 || Kitt Peak || Spacewatch || — || align=right data-sort-value="0.68" | 680 m || 
|-id=302 bgcolor=#E9E9E9
| 332302 ||  || — || October 27, 2006 || Mount Lemmon || Mount Lemmon Survey || — || align=right | 2.5 km || 
|-id=303 bgcolor=#fefefe
| 332303 ||  || — || October 21, 2006 || Kitt Peak || Spacewatch || — || align=right data-sort-value="0.71" | 710 m || 
|-id=304 bgcolor=#fefefe
| 332304 ||  || — || October 16, 2006 || Catalina || CSS || — || align=right data-sort-value="0.84" | 840 m || 
|-id=305 bgcolor=#fefefe
| 332305 ||  || — || November 10, 2006 || Kitt Peak || Spacewatch || — || align=right data-sort-value="0.92" | 920 m || 
|-id=306 bgcolor=#fefefe
| 332306 ||  || — || November 11, 2006 || Kitt Peak || Spacewatch || — || align=right data-sort-value="0.78" | 780 m || 
|-id=307 bgcolor=#fefefe
| 332307 ||  || — || November 11, 2006 || Kitt Peak || Spacewatch || — || align=right data-sort-value="0.83" | 830 m || 
|-id=308 bgcolor=#fefefe
| 332308 ||  || — || November 11, 2006 || Kitt Peak || Spacewatch || FLO || align=right data-sort-value="0.71" | 710 m || 
|-id=309 bgcolor=#fefefe
| 332309 ||  || — || November 11, 2006 || Catalina || CSS || — || align=right data-sort-value="0.90" | 900 m || 
|-id=310 bgcolor=#fefefe
| 332310 ||  || — || November 14, 2006 || Kitt Peak || Spacewatch || V || align=right data-sort-value="0.84" | 840 m || 
|-id=311 bgcolor=#fefefe
| 332311 ||  || — || November 8, 2006 || Palomar || NEAT || — || align=right data-sort-value="0.89" | 890 m || 
|-id=312 bgcolor=#fefefe
| 332312 ||  || — || November 18, 2006 || Socorro || LINEAR || — || align=right | 1.1 km || 
|-id=313 bgcolor=#fefefe
| 332313 ||  || — || November 16, 2006 || Kitt Peak || Spacewatch || — || align=right data-sort-value="0.96" | 960 m || 
|-id=314 bgcolor=#fefefe
| 332314 ||  || — || November 16, 2006 || Kitt Peak || Spacewatch || — || align=right | 1.1 km || 
|-id=315 bgcolor=#fefefe
| 332315 ||  || — || November 16, 2006 || Mount Lemmon || Mount Lemmon Survey || FLO || align=right data-sort-value="0.61" | 610 m || 
|-id=316 bgcolor=#E9E9E9
| 332316 ||  || — || November 16, 2006 || Catalina || CSS || BAR || align=right | 2.2 km || 
|-id=317 bgcolor=#fefefe
| 332317 ||  || — || November 16, 2006 || Kitt Peak || Spacewatch || — || align=right data-sort-value="0.79" | 790 m || 
|-id=318 bgcolor=#fefefe
| 332318 ||  || — || November 17, 2006 || Mount Lemmon || Mount Lemmon Survey || — || align=right data-sort-value="0.91" | 910 m || 
|-id=319 bgcolor=#fefefe
| 332319 ||  || — || November 17, 2006 || Mount Lemmon || Mount Lemmon Survey || V || align=right data-sort-value="0.75" | 750 m || 
|-id=320 bgcolor=#fefefe
| 332320 ||  || — || November 18, 2006 || Socorro || LINEAR || — || align=right | 1.2 km || 
|-id=321 bgcolor=#fefefe
| 332321 ||  || — || November 19, 2006 || Kitt Peak || Spacewatch || V || align=right data-sort-value="0.73" | 730 m || 
|-id=322 bgcolor=#d6d6d6
| 332322 ||  || — || December 18, 2001 || Socorro || LINEAR || — || align=right | 3.7 km || 
|-id=323 bgcolor=#fefefe
| 332323 ||  || — || December 12, 2006 || Kitt Peak || Spacewatch || V || align=right data-sort-value="0.89" | 890 m || 
|-id=324 bgcolor=#fefefe
| 332324 Bobmcdonald ||  ||  || December 12, 2006 || Mauna Kea || D. D. Balam || — || align=right data-sort-value="0.95" | 950 m || 
|-id=325 bgcolor=#fefefe
| 332325 ||  || — || December 12, 2006 || Mount Lemmon || Mount Lemmon Survey || — || align=right data-sort-value="0.76" | 760 m || 
|-id=326 bgcolor=#fefefe
| 332326 Aresi ||  ||  || December 27, 2006 || Gnosca || S. Sposetti || — || align=right | 1.2 km || 
|-id=327 bgcolor=#fefefe
| 332327 ||  || — || December 21, 2006 || Kitt Peak || Spacewatch || — || align=right data-sort-value="0.75" | 750 m || 
|-id=328 bgcolor=#E9E9E9
| 332328 ||  || — || December 21, 2006 || Mount Lemmon || Mount Lemmon Survey || — || align=right | 1.2 km || 
|-id=329 bgcolor=#E9E9E9
| 332329 ||  || — || December 27, 2006 || Mount Lemmon || Mount Lemmon Survey || — || align=right | 1.4 km || 
|-id=330 bgcolor=#fefefe
| 332330 ||  || — || January 10, 2007 || Mount Lemmon || Mount Lemmon Survey || LCI || align=right | 1.3 km || 
|-id=331 bgcolor=#fefefe
| 332331 ||  || — || January 16, 2007 || Catalina || CSS || — || align=right | 1.1 km || 
|-id=332 bgcolor=#fefefe
| 332332 ||  || — || January 24, 2007 || Mount Lemmon || Mount Lemmon Survey || — || align=right | 1.1 km || 
|-id=333 bgcolor=#E9E9E9
| 332333 ||  || — || January 24, 2007 || Catalina || CSS || MIS || align=right | 3.0 km || 
|-id=334 bgcolor=#E9E9E9
| 332334 ||  || — || January 24, 2007 || Catalina || CSS || — || align=right | 1.3 km || 
|-id=335 bgcolor=#E9E9E9
| 332335 ||  || — || January 26, 2007 || Kitt Peak || Spacewatch || — || align=right | 1.3 km || 
|-id=336 bgcolor=#E9E9E9
| 332336 ||  || — || November 24, 2006 || Mount Lemmon || Mount Lemmon Survey || — || align=right | 1.2 km || 
|-id=337 bgcolor=#fefefe
| 332337 ||  || — || December 21, 2006 || Mount Lemmon || Mount Lemmon Survey || — || align=right | 1.2 km || 
|-id=338 bgcolor=#E9E9E9
| 332338 ||  || — || January 27, 2007 || Mount Lemmon || Mount Lemmon Survey || — || align=right | 1.7 km || 
|-id=339 bgcolor=#fefefe
| 332339 ||  || — || February 6, 2007 || Palomar || NEAT || NYS || align=right data-sort-value="0.76" | 760 m || 
|-id=340 bgcolor=#E9E9E9
| 332340 ||  || — || February 6, 2007 || Mount Lemmon || Mount Lemmon Survey || BRG || align=right | 1.8 km || 
|-id=341 bgcolor=#fefefe
| 332341 ||  || — || February 6, 2007 || Mount Lemmon || Mount Lemmon Survey || NYS || align=right data-sort-value="0.76" | 760 m || 
|-id=342 bgcolor=#E9E9E9
| 332342 ||  || — || February 15, 2007 || Catalina || CSS || — || align=right | 2.1 km || 
|-id=343 bgcolor=#E9E9E9
| 332343 ||  || — || May 1, 2003 || Kitt Peak || Spacewatch || — || align=right | 1.7 km || 
|-id=344 bgcolor=#E9E9E9
| 332344 ||  || — || February 17, 2007 || Kitt Peak || Spacewatch || — || align=right | 1.8 km || 
|-id=345 bgcolor=#E9E9E9
| 332345 ||  || — || February 16, 2007 || Palomar || NEAT || — || align=right | 1.6 km || 
|-id=346 bgcolor=#E9E9E9
| 332346 ||  || — || February 17, 2007 || Kitt Peak || Spacewatch || MAR || align=right | 1.3 km || 
|-id=347 bgcolor=#E9E9E9
| 332347 ||  || — || February 19, 2007 || Kitt Peak || Spacewatch || — || align=right data-sort-value="0.94" | 940 m || 
|-id=348 bgcolor=#E9E9E9
| 332348 ||  || — || February 21, 2007 || Mount Lemmon || Mount Lemmon Survey || VIB || align=right | 2.0 km || 
|-id=349 bgcolor=#E9E9E9
| 332349 ||  || — || February 21, 2007 || Kitt Peak || Spacewatch || — || align=right | 1.6 km || 
|-id=350 bgcolor=#E9E9E9
| 332350 ||  || — || February 23, 2007 || Kitt Peak || Spacewatch || — || align=right | 1.8 km || 
|-id=351 bgcolor=#E9E9E9
| 332351 ||  || — || February 23, 2007 || Kitt Peak || Spacewatch || — || align=right | 1.8 km || 
|-id=352 bgcolor=#E9E9E9
| 332352 ||  || — || April 11, 2003 || Kitt Peak || Spacewatch || AER || align=right | 1.6 km || 
|-id=353 bgcolor=#E9E9E9
| 332353 ||  || — || March 9, 2007 || Palomar || NEAT || — || align=right | 3.3 km || 
|-id=354 bgcolor=#E9E9E9
| 332354 ||  || — || March 9, 2007 || Catalina || CSS || EUN || align=right | 1.3 km || 
|-id=355 bgcolor=#E9E9E9
| 332355 ||  || — || February 22, 2007 || Catalina || CSS || — || align=right | 1.9 km || 
|-id=356 bgcolor=#E9E9E9
| 332356 ||  || — || January 27, 2007 || Kitt Peak || Spacewatch || — || align=right | 1.4 km || 
|-id=357 bgcolor=#E9E9E9
| 332357 ||  || — || March 10, 2007 || Mount Lemmon || Mount Lemmon Survey || — || align=right | 1.7 km || 
|-id=358 bgcolor=#E9E9E9
| 332358 ||  || — || March 9, 2007 || Kitt Peak || Spacewatch || — || align=right | 2.3 km || 
|-id=359 bgcolor=#E9E9E9
| 332359 ||  || — || March 9, 2007 || Kitt Peak || Spacewatch || — || align=right | 1.6 km || 
|-id=360 bgcolor=#fefefe
| 332360 ||  || — || March 9, 2007 || Palomar || NEAT || H || align=right data-sort-value="0.81" | 810 m || 
|-id=361 bgcolor=#E9E9E9
| 332361 ||  || — || March 10, 2007 || Kitt Peak || Spacewatch || — || align=right | 1.3 km || 
|-id=362 bgcolor=#E9E9E9
| 332362 ||  || — || March 10, 2007 || Kitt Peak || Spacewatch || — || align=right | 1.8 km || 
|-id=363 bgcolor=#E9E9E9
| 332363 ||  || — || March 9, 2007 || Palomar || NEAT || ADE || align=right | 2.5 km || 
|-id=364 bgcolor=#E9E9E9
| 332364 ||  || — || March 11, 2007 || Kitt Peak || Spacewatch || GER || align=right | 1.8 km || 
|-id=365 bgcolor=#E9E9E9
| 332365 ||  || — || March 11, 2007 || Mount Lemmon || Mount Lemmon Survey || — || align=right | 1.7 km || 
|-id=366 bgcolor=#E9E9E9
| 332366 ||  || — || March 9, 2007 || Mount Lemmon || Mount Lemmon Survey || ADE || align=right | 1.9 km || 
|-id=367 bgcolor=#E9E9E9
| 332367 ||  || — || March 9, 2007 || Mount Lemmon || Mount Lemmon Survey || — || align=right | 2.8 km || 
|-id=368 bgcolor=#E9E9E9
| 332368 ||  || — || March 12, 2007 || Mount Lemmon || Mount Lemmon Survey || — || align=right | 2.1 km || 
|-id=369 bgcolor=#fefefe
| 332369 ||  || — || March 15, 2007 || Mount Lemmon || Mount Lemmon Survey || — || align=right data-sort-value="0.91" | 910 m || 
|-id=370 bgcolor=#E9E9E9
| 332370 ||  || — || March 13, 2007 || Catalina || CSS || MIT || align=right | 3.6 km || 
|-id=371 bgcolor=#E9E9E9
| 332371 ||  || — || March 14, 2007 || Kitt Peak || Spacewatch || HNS || align=right | 1.4 km || 
|-id=372 bgcolor=#E9E9E9
| 332372 ||  || — || March 14, 2007 || Kitt Peak || Spacewatch || GEF || align=right | 1.4 km || 
|-id=373 bgcolor=#d6d6d6
| 332373 ||  || — || January 27, 2007 || Mount Lemmon || Mount Lemmon Survey || KOR || align=right | 2.2 km || 
|-id=374 bgcolor=#E9E9E9
| 332374 ||  || — || March 14, 2007 || Catalina || CSS || — || align=right | 4.3 km || 
|-id=375 bgcolor=#E9E9E9
| 332375 ||  || — || November 24, 2006 || Mount Lemmon || Mount Lemmon Survey || — || align=right | 2.1 km || 
|-id=376 bgcolor=#E9E9E9
| 332376 ||  || — || March 11, 2007 || Purple Mountain || PMO NEO || — || align=right | 2.2 km || 
|-id=377 bgcolor=#E9E9E9
| 332377 ||  || — || March 10, 2007 || Mount Lemmon || Mount Lemmon Survey || — || align=right | 1.6 km || 
|-id=378 bgcolor=#d6d6d6
| 332378 ||  || — || March 16, 2007 || Kitt Peak || Spacewatch || 615 || align=right | 1.5 km || 
|-id=379 bgcolor=#E9E9E9
| 332379 ||  || — || March 23, 2007 || Pla D'Arguines || R. Ferrando || — || align=right | 1.6 km || 
|-id=380 bgcolor=#E9E9E9
| 332380 ||  || — || March 20, 2007 || Kitt Peak || Spacewatch || JUN || align=right | 1.0 km || 
|-id=381 bgcolor=#fefefe
| 332381 ||  || — || November 22, 2005 || Kitt Peak || Spacewatch || MAS || align=right data-sort-value="0.88" | 880 m || 
|-id=382 bgcolor=#E9E9E9
| 332382 ||  || — || March 22, 2007 || Siding Spring || SSS || — || align=right | 2.6 km || 
|-id=383 bgcolor=#E9E9E9
| 332383 ||  || — || March 26, 2007 || Kitt Peak || Spacewatch || — || align=right | 1.1 km || 
|-id=384 bgcolor=#E9E9E9
| 332384 ||  || — || March 29, 2007 || Kitt Peak || Spacewatch || — || align=right | 2.8 km || 
|-id=385 bgcolor=#d6d6d6
| 332385 ||  || — || April 11, 2007 || Kitt Peak || Spacewatch || TRP || align=right | 3.1 km || 
|-id=386 bgcolor=#E9E9E9
| 332386 ||  || — || March 12, 2007 || Catalina || CSS || JUN || align=right | 1.3 km || 
|-id=387 bgcolor=#E9E9E9
| 332387 ||  || — || April 14, 2007 || Kitt Peak || Spacewatch || — || align=right | 1.6 km || 
|-id=388 bgcolor=#E9E9E9
| 332388 ||  || — || April 15, 2007 || Socorro || LINEAR || — || align=right | 3.5 km || 
|-id=389 bgcolor=#E9E9E9
| 332389 ||  || — || April 14, 2007 || Kitt Peak || Spacewatch || — || align=right | 4.0 km || 
|-id=390 bgcolor=#E9E9E9
| 332390 ||  || — || December 25, 2005 || Kitt Peak || Spacewatch || — || align=right | 2.1 km || 
|-id=391 bgcolor=#E9E9E9
| 332391 ||  || — || April 18, 2007 || Kitt Peak || Spacewatch || HEN || align=right | 1.1 km || 
|-id=392 bgcolor=#E9E9E9
| 332392 ||  || — || April 20, 2007 || Kitt Peak || Spacewatch || NEM || align=right | 2.5 km || 
|-id=393 bgcolor=#E9E9E9
| 332393 ||  || — || April 20, 2007 || Kitt Peak || Spacewatch || — || align=right | 2.6 km || 
|-id=394 bgcolor=#E9E9E9
| 332394 ||  || — || April 20, 2007 || Kitt Peak || Spacewatch || — || align=right | 2.4 km || 
|-id=395 bgcolor=#E9E9E9
| 332395 ||  || — || November 10, 2004 || Kitt Peak || Spacewatch || — || align=right | 3.1 km || 
|-id=396 bgcolor=#E9E9E9
| 332396 ||  || — || April 23, 2007 || Catalina || CSS || — || align=right | 2.9 km || 
|-id=397 bgcolor=#d6d6d6
| 332397 ||  || — || May 7, 2007 || Kitt Peak || Spacewatch || — || align=right | 5.9 km || 
|-id=398 bgcolor=#d6d6d6
| 332398 ||  || — || April 14, 2007 || Kitt Peak || Spacewatch || — || align=right | 2.7 km || 
|-id=399 bgcolor=#d6d6d6
| 332399 ||  || — || May 10, 2007 || Catalina || CSS || — || align=right | 2.8 km || 
|-id=400 bgcolor=#E9E9E9
| 332400 ||  || — || May 12, 2007 || Mount Lemmon || Mount Lemmon Survey || — || align=right | 3.1 km || 
|}

332401–332500 

|-bgcolor=#E9E9E9
| 332401 ||  || — || May 12, 2007 || Mount Lemmon || Mount Lemmon Survey || — || align=right | 1.4 km || 
|-id=402 bgcolor=#d6d6d6
| 332402 ||  || — || June 9, 2007 || Kitt Peak || Spacewatch || — || align=right | 2.4 km || 
|-id=403 bgcolor=#E9E9E9
| 332403 ||  || — || June 10, 2007 || Kitt Peak || Spacewatch || — || align=right | 3.4 km || 
|-id=404 bgcolor=#E9E9E9
| 332404 ||  || — || June 13, 2007 || Kitt Peak || Spacewatch || — || align=right | 2.9 km || 
|-id=405 bgcolor=#d6d6d6
| 332405 ||  || — || June 14, 2007 || Kitt Peak || Spacewatch || — || align=right | 3.2 km || 
|-id=406 bgcolor=#d6d6d6
| 332406 ||  || — || June 9, 2007 || Kitt Peak || Spacewatch || BRA || align=right | 1.2 km || 
|-id=407 bgcolor=#E9E9E9
| 332407 ||  || — || June 18, 2007 || Kitt Peak || Spacewatch || — || align=right | 2.8 km || 
|-id=408 bgcolor=#FFC2E0
| 332408 ||  || — || June 23, 2007 || Catalina || CSS || APO +1km || align=right data-sort-value="0.98" | 980 m || 
|-id=409 bgcolor=#d6d6d6
| 332409 ||  || — || July 13, 2007 || Andrushivka || Andrushivka Obs. || — || align=right | 4.7 km || 
|-id=410 bgcolor=#d6d6d6
| 332410 ||  || — || July 17, 2007 || Bergisch Gladbach || W. Bickel || — || align=right | 5.6 km || 
|-id=411 bgcolor=#d6d6d6
| 332411 ||  || — || August 8, 2007 || Eskridge || G. Hug || EUP || align=right | 5.2 km || 
|-id=412 bgcolor=#d6d6d6
| 332412 ||  || — || August 12, 2007 || Socorro || LINEAR || — || align=right | 4.3 km || 
|-id=413 bgcolor=#d6d6d6
| 332413 ||  || — || August 9, 2007 || Socorro || LINEAR || — || align=right | 3.7 km || 
|-id=414 bgcolor=#fefefe
| 332414 ||  || — || August 22, 2007 || Socorro || LINEAR || H || align=right data-sort-value="0.85" | 850 m || 
|-id=415 bgcolor=#d6d6d6
| 332415 ||  || — || September 9, 2007 || Kitt Peak || Spacewatch || — || align=right | 3.4 km || 
|-id=416 bgcolor=#E9E9E9
| 332416 ||  || — || September 11, 2007 || Kitt Peak || Spacewatch || — || align=right | 1.7 km || 
|-id=417 bgcolor=#d6d6d6
| 332417 ||  || — || September 12, 2007 || Catalina || CSS || — || align=right | 3.9 km || 
|-id=418 bgcolor=#d6d6d6
| 332418 ||  || — || September 12, 2007 || Catalina || CSS || TIR || align=right | 3.6 km || 
|-id=419 bgcolor=#d6d6d6
| 332419 ||  || — || September 10, 2007 || Catalina || CSS || — || align=right | 5.1 km || 
|-id=420 bgcolor=#d6d6d6
| 332420 ||  || — || September 15, 2007 || Anderson Mesa || LONEOS || LIX || align=right | 6.8 km || 
|-id=421 bgcolor=#d6d6d6
| 332421 ||  || — || September 15, 2007 || Kitt Peak || Spacewatch || HYG || align=right | 3.3 km || 
|-id=422 bgcolor=#d6d6d6
| 332422 ||  || — || September 3, 2007 || Vail-Jarnac || Jarnac Obs. || — || align=right | 3.2 km || 
|-id=423 bgcolor=#d6d6d6
| 332423 ||  || — || September 8, 2007 || Anderson Mesa || LONEOS || — || align=right | 3.5 km || 
|-id=424 bgcolor=#d6d6d6
| 332424 ||  || — || September 5, 2007 || Catalina || CSS || — || align=right | 4.7 km || 
|-id=425 bgcolor=#d6d6d6
| 332425 ||  || — || September 9, 2007 || Anderson Mesa || LONEOS || EOS || align=right | 2.7 km || 
|-id=426 bgcolor=#E9E9E9
| 332426 ||  || — || September 24, 2007 || Kitt Peak || Spacewatch || — || align=right | 2.2 km || 
|-id=427 bgcolor=#fefefe
| 332427 ||  || — || October 9, 2007 || Socorro || LINEAR || H || align=right data-sort-value="0.69" | 690 m || 
|-id=428 bgcolor=#d6d6d6
| 332428 ||  || — || October 10, 2007 || Purple Mountain || PMO NEO || — || align=right | 5.5 km || 
|-id=429 bgcolor=#d6d6d6
| 332429 ||  || — || October 9, 2007 || Catalina || CSS || — || align=right | 4.3 km || 
|-id=430 bgcolor=#d6d6d6
| 332430 ||  || — || October 8, 2007 || Catalina || CSS || — || align=right | 3.9 km || 
|-id=431 bgcolor=#d6d6d6
| 332431 ||  || — || October 8, 2007 || Kitt Peak || Spacewatch || — || align=right | 3.3 km || 
|-id=432 bgcolor=#d6d6d6
| 332432 ||  || — || October 13, 2007 || Catalina || CSS || LUT || align=right | 5.3 km || 
|-id=433 bgcolor=#d6d6d6
| 332433 ||  || — || October 5, 2007 || Siding Spring || SSS || EUP || align=right | 4.0 km || 
|-id=434 bgcolor=#d6d6d6
| 332434 ||  || — || October 16, 2007 || Andrushivka || Andrushivka Obs. || — || align=right | 4.7 km || 
|-id=435 bgcolor=#d6d6d6
| 332435 ||  || — || October 8, 2007 || Catalina || CSS || MEL || align=right | 4.2 km || 
|-id=436 bgcolor=#fefefe
| 332436 ||  || — || November 2, 2007 || Mount Lemmon || Mount Lemmon Survey || MAS || align=right data-sort-value="0.88" | 880 m || 
|-id=437 bgcolor=#E9E9E9
| 332437 ||  || — || October 9, 2007 || Kitt Peak || Spacewatch || WIT || align=right | 1.1 km || 
|-id=438 bgcolor=#fefefe
| 332438 ||  || — || October 14, 2007 || Catalina || CSS || H || align=right | 1.2 km || 
|-id=439 bgcolor=#E9E9E9
| 332439 ||  || — || December 13, 2007 || Socorro || LINEAR || — || align=right | 1.2 km || 
|-id=440 bgcolor=#E9E9E9
| 332440 ||  || — || December 13, 2007 || Socorro || LINEAR || — || align=right | 1.6 km || 
|-id=441 bgcolor=#fefefe
| 332441 ||  || — || December 6, 2007 || Mount Lemmon || Mount Lemmon Survey || V || align=right data-sort-value="0.65" | 650 m || 
|-id=442 bgcolor=#d6d6d6
| 332442 ||  || — || December 16, 2007 || Mount Lemmon || Mount Lemmon Survey || ALA || align=right | 8.1 km || 
|-id=443 bgcolor=#fefefe
| 332443 ||  || — || December 30, 2007 || Mount Lemmon || Mount Lemmon Survey || — || align=right data-sort-value="0.79" | 790 m || 
|-id=444 bgcolor=#fefefe
| 332444 ||  || — || December 14, 2007 || Mount Lemmon || Mount Lemmon Survey || FLO || align=right | 1.00 km || 
|-id=445 bgcolor=#fefefe
| 332445 ||  || — || November 8, 2007 || Mount Lemmon || Mount Lemmon Survey || FLO || align=right data-sort-value="0.83" | 830 m || 
|-id=446 bgcolor=#FFC2E0
| 332446 ||  || — || January 10, 2008 || Socorro || LINEAR || APOPHA || align=right data-sort-value="0.41" | 410 m || 
|-id=447 bgcolor=#fefefe
| 332447 ||  || — || January 10, 2008 || Kitt Peak || Spacewatch || — || align=right data-sort-value="0.75" | 750 m || 
|-id=448 bgcolor=#fefefe
| 332448 ||  || — || January 10, 2008 || Kitt Peak || Spacewatch || — || align=right data-sort-value="0.70" | 700 m || 
|-id=449 bgcolor=#fefefe
| 332449 ||  || — || January 11, 2008 || Kitt Peak || Spacewatch || — || align=right data-sort-value="0.86" | 860 m || 
|-id=450 bgcolor=#fefefe
| 332450 ||  || — || January 19, 2008 || Mount Lemmon || Mount Lemmon Survey || — || align=right | 1.0 km || 
|-id=451 bgcolor=#fefefe
| 332451 ||  || — || January 31, 2008 || Mount Lemmon || Mount Lemmon Survey || FLO || align=right data-sort-value="0.71" | 710 m || 
|-id=452 bgcolor=#fefefe
| 332452 ||  || — || February 3, 2008 || Kitt Peak || Spacewatch || NYS || align=right data-sort-value="0.84" | 840 m || 
|-id=453 bgcolor=#fefefe
| 332453 ||  || — || February 3, 2008 || Kitt Peak || Spacewatch || — || align=right | 1.0 km || 
|-id=454 bgcolor=#fefefe
| 332454 ||  || — || February 6, 2008 || Catalina || CSS || — || align=right data-sort-value="0.91" | 910 m || 
|-id=455 bgcolor=#fefefe
| 332455 ||  || — || February 2, 2008 || Kitt Peak || Spacewatch || — || align=right data-sort-value="0.76" | 760 m || 
|-id=456 bgcolor=#fefefe
| 332456 ||  || — || February 2, 2008 || Kitt Peak || Spacewatch || V || align=right data-sort-value="0.77" | 770 m || 
|-id=457 bgcolor=#fefefe
| 332457 ||  || — || February 8, 2008 || Bergisch Gladbac || W. Bickel || NYS || align=right data-sort-value="0.61" | 610 m || 
|-id=458 bgcolor=#fefefe
| 332458 ||  || — || February 7, 2008 || Kitt Peak || Spacewatch || FLO || align=right data-sort-value="0.66" | 660 m || 
|-id=459 bgcolor=#fefefe
| 332459 ||  || — || February 26, 2004 || Kitt Peak || M. W. Buie || MAS || align=right data-sort-value="0.77" | 770 m || 
|-id=460 bgcolor=#fefefe
| 332460 ||  || — || February 3, 2008 || Catalina || CSS || — || align=right | 1.1 km || 
|-id=461 bgcolor=#fefefe
| 332461 ||  || — || February 8, 2008 || Kitt Peak || Spacewatch || FLO || align=right data-sort-value="0.66" | 660 m || 
|-id=462 bgcolor=#fefefe
| 332462 ||  || — || February 9, 2008 || Kitt Peak || Spacewatch || — || align=right data-sort-value="0.97" | 970 m || 
|-id=463 bgcolor=#fefefe
| 332463 ||  || — || February 9, 2008 || Catalina || CSS || — || align=right data-sort-value="0.88" | 880 m || 
|-id=464 bgcolor=#fefefe
| 332464 ||  || — || February 10, 2008 || Catalina || CSS || — || align=right data-sort-value="0.65" | 650 m || 
|-id=465 bgcolor=#fefefe
| 332465 ||  || — || February 10, 2008 || Kitt Peak || Spacewatch || — || align=right data-sort-value="0.98" | 980 m || 
|-id=466 bgcolor=#fefefe
| 332466 ||  || — || February 28, 2008 || Kitt Peak || Spacewatch || MAS || align=right data-sort-value="0.88" | 880 m || 
|-id=467 bgcolor=#fefefe
| 332467 ||  || — || February 29, 2008 || Mount Lemmon || Mount Lemmon Survey || — || align=right data-sort-value="0.96" | 960 m || 
|-id=468 bgcolor=#fefefe
| 332468 ||  || — || February 28, 2008 || Kitt Peak || Spacewatch || — || align=right data-sort-value="0.92" | 920 m || 
|-id=469 bgcolor=#fefefe
| 332469 ||  || — || February 29, 2008 || Kitt Peak || Spacewatch || — || align=right data-sort-value="0.79" | 790 m || 
|-id=470 bgcolor=#fefefe
| 332470 ||  || — || February 27, 2008 || Kitt Peak || Spacewatch || — || align=right data-sort-value="0.89" | 890 m || 
|-id=471 bgcolor=#fefefe
| 332471 ||  || — || February 27, 2008 || Kitt Peak || Spacewatch || critical || align=right data-sort-value="0.71" | 710 m || 
|-id=472 bgcolor=#fefefe
| 332472 ||  || — || February 28, 2008 || Kitt Peak || Spacewatch || NYS || align=right data-sort-value="0.67" | 670 m || 
|-id=473 bgcolor=#fefefe
| 332473 ||  || — || March 6, 2008 || Kitt Peak || Spacewatch || NYS || align=right data-sort-value="0.69" | 690 m || 
|-id=474 bgcolor=#fefefe
| 332474 ||  || — || February 9, 2008 || Kitt Peak || Spacewatch || — || align=right data-sort-value="0.65" | 650 m || 
|-id=475 bgcolor=#fefefe
| 332475 ||  || — || March 7, 2008 || Catalina || CSS || — || align=right data-sort-value="0.86" | 860 m || 
|-id=476 bgcolor=#fefefe
| 332476 ||  || — || March 7, 2008 || Kitt Peak || Spacewatch || NYS || align=right data-sort-value="0.63" | 630 m || 
|-id=477 bgcolor=#fefefe
| 332477 ||  || — || March 8, 2008 || Socorro || LINEAR || V || align=right data-sort-value="0.93" | 930 m || 
|-id=478 bgcolor=#fefefe
| 332478 ||  || — || March 6, 2008 || Mount Lemmon || Mount Lemmon Survey || — || align=right data-sort-value="0.87" | 870 m || 
|-id=479 bgcolor=#fefefe
| 332479 ||  || — || March 11, 2008 || Catalina || CSS || — || align=right data-sort-value="0.91" | 910 m || 
|-id=480 bgcolor=#fefefe
| 332480 ||  || — || March 7, 2008 || Mount Lemmon || Mount Lemmon Survey || — || align=right data-sort-value="0.71" | 710 m || 
|-id=481 bgcolor=#fefefe
| 332481 ||  || — || March 8, 2008 || Kitt Peak || Spacewatch || — || align=right data-sort-value="0.82" | 820 m || 
|-id=482 bgcolor=#fefefe
| 332482 ||  || — || March 9, 2008 || Kitt Peak || Spacewatch || — || align=right data-sort-value="0.81" | 810 m || 
|-id=483 bgcolor=#fefefe
| 332483 ||  || — || March 11, 2008 || Kitt Peak || Spacewatch || NYS || align=right data-sort-value="0.88" | 880 m || 
|-id=484 bgcolor=#fefefe
| 332484 ||  || — || March 11, 2008 || Mount Lemmon || Mount Lemmon Survey || — || align=right data-sort-value="0.84" | 840 m || 
|-id=485 bgcolor=#fefefe
| 332485 ||  || — || March 11, 2008 || Kitt Peak || Spacewatch || — || align=right data-sort-value="0.85" | 850 m || 
|-id=486 bgcolor=#fefefe
| 332486 ||  || — || March 13, 2008 || Kitt Peak || Spacewatch || — || align=right | 2.1 km || 
|-id=487 bgcolor=#fefefe
| 332487 ||  || — || March 10, 2008 || Kitt Peak || Spacewatch || — || align=right data-sort-value="0.85" | 850 m || 
|-id=488 bgcolor=#fefefe
| 332488 ||  || — || March 4, 2008 || Mount Lemmon || Mount Lemmon Survey || — || align=right data-sort-value="0.83" | 830 m || 
|-id=489 bgcolor=#fefefe
| 332489 ||  || — || March 27, 2008 || Mount Lemmon || Mount Lemmon Survey || MAS || align=right data-sort-value="0.74" | 740 m || 
|-id=490 bgcolor=#fefefe
| 332490 ||  || — || March 27, 2008 || Mount Lemmon || Mount Lemmon Survey || V || align=right data-sort-value="0.68" | 680 m || 
|-id=491 bgcolor=#E9E9E9
| 332491 ||  || — || March 4, 2008 || Kitt Peak || Spacewatch || KON || align=right | 2.4 km || 
|-id=492 bgcolor=#fefefe
| 332492 ||  || — || March 28, 2008 || Mount Lemmon || Mount Lemmon Survey || — || align=right data-sort-value="0.94" | 940 m || 
|-id=493 bgcolor=#fefefe
| 332493 ||  || — || March 29, 2008 || Catalina || CSS || NYS || align=right data-sort-value="0.76" | 760 m || 
|-id=494 bgcolor=#fefefe
| 332494 ||  || — || October 21, 2006 || Catalina || CSS || NYS || align=right data-sort-value="0.77" | 770 m || 
|-id=495 bgcolor=#fefefe
| 332495 ||  || — || March 30, 2008 || Kitt Peak || Spacewatch || V || align=right data-sort-value="0.74" | 740 m || 
|-id=496 bgcolor=#fefefe
| 332496 ||  || — || March 30, 2008 || Catalina || CSS || — || align=right | 1.0 km || 
|-id=497 bgcolor=#fefefe
| 332497 ||  || — || March 30, 2008 || Kitt Peak || Spacewatch || V || align=right data-sort-value="0.80" | 800 m || 
|-id=498 bgcolor=#fefefe
| 332498 ||  || — || March 31, 2008 || Mount Lemmon || Mount Lemmon Survey || FLO || align=right data-sort-value="0.64" | 640 m || 
|-id=499 bgcolor=#fefefe
| 332499 ||  || — || March 31, 2008 || Kitt Peak || Spacewatch || MAS || align=right data-sort-value="0.76" | 760 m || 
|-id=500 bgcolor=#fefefe
| 332500 ||  || — || March 31, 2008 || Mount Lemmon || Mount Lemmon Survey || NYS || align=right data-sort-value="0.62" | 620 m || 
|}

332501–332600 

|-bgcolor=#fefefe
| 332501 ||  || — || March 31, 2008 || Kitt Peak || Spacewatch || MAS || align=right data-sort-value="0.76" | 760 m || 
|-id=502 bgcolor=#fefefe
| 332502 ||  || — || March 31, 2008 || Kitt Peak || Spacewatch || V || align=right data-sort-value="0.81" | 810 m || 
|-id=503 bgcolor=#fefefe
| 332503 ||  || — || March 28, 2008 || Kitt Peak || Spacewatch || — || align=right data-sort-value="0.80" | 800 m || 
|-id=504 bgcolor=#fefefe
| 332504 ||  || — || March 28, 2008 || Mount Lemmon || Mount Lemmon Survey || MAS || align=right data-sort-value="0.77" | 770 m || 
|-id=505 bgcolor=#fefefe
| 332505 ||  || — || April 1, 2008 || Kitt Peak || Spacewatch || — || align=right data-sort-value="0.86" | 860 m || 
|-id=506 bgcolor=#fefefe
| 332506 ||  || — || April 3, 2008 || Mount Lemmon || Mount Lemmon Survey || MAS || align=right data-sort-value="0.68" | 680 m || 
|-id=507 bgcolor=#fefefe
| 332507 ||  || — || February 9, 2008 || Mount Lemmon || Mount Lemmon Survey || MAS || align=right data-sort-value="0.76" | 760 m || 
|-id=508 bgcolor=#fefefe
| 332508 ||  || — || April 5, 2008 || Mount Lemmon || Mount Lemmon Survey || — || align=right data-sort-value="0.82" | 820 m || 
|-id=509 bgcolor=#fefefe
| 332509 ||  || — || April 8, 2008 || Kitt Peak || Spacewatch || NYS || align=right data-sort-value="0.81" | 810 m || 
|-id=510 bgcolor=#fefefe
| 332510 ||  || — || April 8, 2008 || Kitt Peak || Spacewatch || — || align=right | 1.1 km || 
|-id=511 bgcolor=#fefefe
| 332511 ||  || — || April 10, 2008 || Kitt Peak || Spacewatch || — || align=right data-sort-value="0.70" | 700 m || 
|-id=512 bgcolor=#fefefe
| 332512 ||  || — || April 10, 2008 || Kitt Peak || Spacewatch || NYS || align=right data-sort-value="0.71" | 710 m || 
|-id=513 bgcolor=#fefefe
| 332513 ||  || — || July 8, 2005 || Kitt Peak || Spacewatch || V || align=right data-sort-value="0.74" | 740 m || 
|-id=514 bgcolor=#fefefe
| 332514 ||  || — || April 1, 2008 || Mount Lemmon || Mount Lemmon Survey || V || align=right data-sort-value="0.59" | 590 m || 
|-id=515 bgcolor=#fefefe
| 332515 ||  || — || April 11, 2008 || Socorro || LINEAR || — || align=right | 1.2 km || 
|-id=516 bgcolor=#E9E9E9
| 332516 ||  || — || May 11, 2000 || Kitt Peak || Spacewatch || — || align=right | 1.2 km || 
|-id=517 bgcolor=#fefefe
| 332517 ||  || — || May 1, 2008 || Catalina || CSS || PHO || align=right | 1.2 km || 
|-id=518 bgcolor=#fefefe
| 332518 ||  || — || May 4, 2008 || Mount Lemmon || Mount Lemmon Survey || — || align=right data-sort-value="0.89" | 890 m || 
|-id=519 bgcolor=#E9E9E9
| 332519 ||  || — || November 4, 2005 || Mount Lemmon || Mount Lemmon Survey || RAF || align=right | 1.5 km || 
|-id=520 bgcolor=#fefefe
| 332520 ||  || — || May 3, 2008 || Mount Lemmon || Mount Lemmon Survey || — || align=right data-sort-value="0.93" | 930 m || 
|-id=521 bgcolor=#E9E9E9
| 332521 ||  || — || May 15, 2008 || Mount Lemmon || Mount Lemmon Survey || MAR || align=right | 1.3 km || 
|-id=522 bgcolor=#fefefe
| 332522 ||  || — || May 27, 2008 || Kitt Peak || Spacewatch || NYS || align=right data-sort-value="0.73" | 730 m || 
|-id=523 bgcolor=#fefefe
| 332523 ||  || — || May 30, 2008 || Kitt Peak || Spacewatch || — || align=right data-sort-value="0.87" | 870 m || 
|-id=524 bgcolor=#fefefe
| 332524 ||  || — || May 29, 2008 || Kitt Peak || Spacewatch || V || align=right data-sort-value="0.80" | 800 m || 
|-id=525 bgcolor=#fefefe
| 332525 ||  || — || June 3, 2008 || Kitt Peak || Spacewatch || V || align=right data-sort-value="0.65" | 650 m || 
|-id=526 bgcolor=#fefefe
| 332526 ||  || — || June 6, 2008 || Kitt Peak || Spacewatch || — || align=right | 1.3 km || 
|-id=527 bgcolor=#E9E9E9
| 332527 ||  || — || July 2, 2008 || Kitt Peak || Spacewatch || — || align=right | 1.6 km || 
|-id=528 bgcolor=#E9E9E9
| 332528 ||  || — || July 11, 2008 || Siding Spring || SSS || BRG || align=right | 2.1 km || 
|-id=529 bgcolor=#E9E9E9
| 332529 ||  || — || July 27, 2008 || Bisei SG Center || BATTeRS || — || align=right | 2.2 km || 
|-id=530 bgcolor=#E9E9E9
| 332530 Canders ||  ||  || July 29, 2008 || Baldone || K. Černis, I. Eglītis || WIT || align=right data-sort-value="0.93" | 930 m || 
|-id=531 bgcolor=#E9E9E9
| 332531 ||  || — || July 29, 2008 || Kitt Peak || Spacewatch || — || align=right | 1.6 km || 
|-id=532 bgcolor=#E9E9E9
| 332532 ||  || — || July 29, 2008 || Kitt Peak || Spacewatch || HEN || align=right data-sort-value="0.90" | 900 m || 
|-id=533 bgcolor=#E9E9E9
| 332533 ||  || — || July 30, 2008 || Mount Lemmon || Mount Lemmon Survey || — || align=right | 3.2 km || 
|-id=534 bgcolor=#E9E9E9
| 332534 ||  || — || July 30, 2008 || Catalina || CSS || — || align=right | 3.6 km || 
|-id=535 bgcolor=#E9E9E9
| 332535 ||  || — || August 2, 2008 || La Sagra || OAM Obs. || — || align=right | 2.9 km || 
|-id=536 bgcolor=#E9E9E9
| 332536 ||  || — || June 7, 2008 || Catalina || CSS || — || align=right | 2.0 km || 
|-id=537 bgcolor=#E9E9E9
| 332537 ||  || — || August 6, 2008 || Marly || P. Kocher || — || align=right | 3.3 km || 
|-id=538 bgcolor=#E9E9E9
| 332538 ||  || — || August 10, 2008 || Črni Vrh || Črni Vrh || — || align=right | 1.1 km || 
|-id=539 bgcolor=#E9E9E9
| 332539 ||  || — || August 2, 2008 || Siding Spring || SSS || POS || align=right | 4.8 km || 
|-id=540 bgcolor=#E9E9E9
| 332540 ||  || — || August 6, 2008 || Siding Spring || SSS || GAL || align=right | 2.4 km || 
|-id=541 bgcolor=#E9E9E9
| 332541 ||  || — || August 25, 2008 || Dauban || F. Kugel || — || align=right | 2.6 km || 
|-id=542 bgcolor=#E9E9E9
| 332542 ||  || — || August 25, 2008 || La Sagra || OAM Obs. || AEO || align=right | 1.4 km || 
|-id=543 bgcolor=#E9E9E9
| 332543 ||  || — || August 26, 2008 || La Sagra || OAM Obs. || — || align=right | 1.9 km || 
|-id=544 bgcolor=#E9E9E9
| 332544 ||  || — || August 26, 2008 || La Sagra || OAM Obs. || JUN || align=right | 1.5 km || 
|-id=545 bgcolor=#d6d6d6
| 332545 ||  || — || August 27, 2008 || Altschwendt || W. Ries || — || align=right | 2.9 km || 
|-id=546 bgcolor=#d6d6d6
| 332546 ||  || — || August 28, 2008 || Hibiscus || S. F. Hönig, N. Teamo || — || align=right | 3.2 km || 
|-id=547 bgcolor=#E9E9E9
| 332547 ||  || — || August 26, 2008 || Socorro || LINEAR || — || align=right | 3.2 km || 
|-id=548 bgcolor=#E9E9E9
| 332548 ||  || — || August 29, 2008 || Dauban || F. Kugel || — || align=right | 2.9 km || 
|-id=549 bgcolor=#E9E9E9
| 332549 ||  || — || August 30, 2008 || Socorro || LINEAR || — || align=right | 1.7 km || 
|-id=550 bgcolor=#d6d6d6
| 332550 ||  || — || August 21, 2008 || Kitt Peak || Spacewatch || KAR || align=right | 1.4 km || 
|-id=551 bgcolor=#E9E9E9
| 332551 ||  || — || September 1, 2008 || La Sagra || OAM Obs. || — || align=right | 2.0 km || 
|-id=552 bgcolor=#E9E9E9
| 332552 ||  || — || September 3, 2008 || Hibiscus || J.-C. Pelle || — || align=right | 2.4 km || 
|-id=553 bgcolor=#d6d6d6
| 332553 ||  || — || September 2, 2008 || Kitt Peak || Spacewatch || NAE || align=right | 1.9 km || 
|-id=554 bgcolor=#E9E9E9
| 332554 ||  || — || September 2, 2008 || La Sagra || OAM Obs. || — || align=right | 1.6 km || 
|-id=555 bgcolor=#E9E9E9
| 332555 ||  || — || September 9, 2008 || Catalina || CSS || — || align=right | 3.2 km || 
|-id=556 bgcolor=#d6d6d6
| 332556 ||  || — || September 2, 2008 || Kitt Peak || Spacewatch || 615critical || align=right | 1.2 km || 
|-id=557 bgcolor=#d6d6d6
| 332557 ||  || — || September 2, 2008 || Kitt Peak || Spacewatch || — || align=right | 2.4 km || 
|-id=558 bgcolor=#E9E9E9
| 332558 ||  || — || September 3, 2008 || Kitt Peak || Spacewatch || — || align=right | 1.6 km || 
|-id=559 bgcolor=#d6d6d6
| 332559 ||  || — || September 8, 2008 || Dauban || F. Kugel || NAE || align=right | 4.5 km || 
|-id=560 bgcolor=#E9E9E9
| 332560 ||  || — || September 4, 2008 || Kitt Peak || Spacewatch || — || align=right | 2.1 km || 
|-id=561 bgcolor=#d6d6d6
| 332561 ||  || — || September 4, 2008 || Kitt Peak || Spacewatch || THM || align=right | 2.7 km || 
|-id=562 bgcolor=#d6d6d6
| 332562 ||  || — || September 5, 2008 || Kitt Peak || Spacewatch || VER || align=right | 2.4 km || 
|-id=563 bgcolor=#d6d6d6
| 332563 ||  || — || September 5, 2008 || Kitt Peak || Spacewatch || — || align=right | 2.8 km || 
|-id=564 bgcolor=#E9E9E9
| 332564 ||  || — || September 7, 2008 || Mount Lemmon || Mount Lemmon Survey || NEM || align=right | 2.9 km || 
|-id=565 bgcolor=#d6d6d6
| 332565 ||  || — || September 9, 2008 || Kitt Peak || Spacewatch || CRO || align=right | 3.3 km || 
|-id=566 bgcolor=#E9E9E9
| 332566 ||  || — || September 6, 2008 || Catalina || CSS || — || align=right | 2.6 km || 
|-id=567 bgcolor=#E9E9E9
| 332567 ||  || — || September 6, 2008 || Catalina || CSS || JUN || align=right | 1.2 km || 
|-id=568 bgcolor=#d6d6d6
| 332568 ||  || — || August 12, 2008 || La Sagra || OAM Obs. || — || align=right | 3.1 km || 
|-id=569 bgcolor=#d6d6d6
| 332569 || 2008 SH || — || September 18, 2008 || Sandlot || G. Hug || — || align=right | 3.3 km || 
|-id=570 bgcolor=#E9E9E9
| 332570 ||  || — || September 24, 2008 || Goodricke-Pigott || R. A. Tucker || — || align=right | 1.5 km || 
|-id=571 bgcolor=#d6d6d6
| 332571 ||  || — || September 20, 2008 || Kitt Peak || Spacewatch || EOS || align=right | 2.1 km || 
|-id=572 bgcolor=#d6d6d6
| 332572 ||  || — || September 20, 2008 || Kitt Peak || Spacewatch || — || align=right | 3.4 km || 
|-id=573 bgcolor=#d6d6d6
| 332573 ||  || — || September 20, 2008 || Mount Lemmon || Mount Lemmon Survey || — || align=right | 3.5 km || 
|-id=574 bgcolor=#E9E9E9
| 332574 ||  || — || September 20, 2008 || Mount Lemmon || Mount Lemmon Survey || MIS || align=right | 3.1 km || 
|-id=575 bgcolor=#d6d6d6
| 332575 ||  || — || September 20, 2008 || Kitt Peak || Spacewatch || — || align=right | 3.8 km || 
|-id=576 bgcolor=#E9E9E9
| 332576 ||  || — || September 21, 2008 || Mount Lemmon || Mount Lemmon Survey || JUN || align=right | 1.6 km || 
|-id=577 bgcolor=#d6d6d6
| 332577 ||  || — || September 22, 2008 || Kitt Peak || Spacewatch || VER || align=right | 3.7 km || 
|-id=578 bgcolor=#E9E9E9
| 332578 ||  || — || September 23, 2008 || Catalina || CSS || — || align=right | 2.1 km || 
|-id=579 bgcolor=#d6d6d6
| 332579 ||  || — || September 22, 2008 || Kitt Peak || Spacewatch || HYG || align=right | 3.2 km || 
|-id=580 bgcolor=#d6d6d6
| 332580 ||  || — || September 24, 2008 || Dauban || F. Kugel || — || align=right | 3.7 km || 
|-id=581 bgcolor=#d6d6d6
| 332581 ||  || — || September 21, 2008 || Kitt Peak || Spacewatch || EOS || align=right | 2.0 km || 
|-id=582 bgcolor=#d6d6d6
| 332582 ||  || — || September 21, 2008 || Kitt Peak || Spacewatch || CHA || align=right | 2.4 km || 
|-id=583 bgcolor=#d6d6d6
| 332583 ||  || — || September 9, 2008 || Mount Lemmon || Mount Lemmon Survey || — || align=right | 2.5 km || 
|-id=584 bgcolor=#d6d6d6
| 332584 ||  || — || September 22, 2008 || Kitt Peak || Spacewatch || EUP || align=right | 4.3 km || 
|-id=585 bgcolor=#d6d6d6
| 332585 ||  || — || September 24, 2008 || Mount Lemmon || Mount Lemmon Survey || — || align=right | 3.1 km || 
|-id=586 bgcolor=#E9E9E9
| 332586 ||  || — || September 29, 2008 || Dauban || F. Kugel || — || align=right | 1.9 km || 
|-id=587 bgcolor=#d6d6d6
| 332587 ||  || — || September 28, 2008 || Dauban || F. Kugel || — || align=right | 3.1 km || 
|-id=588 bgcolor=#E9E9E9
| 332588 ||  || — || September 22, 2008 || Socorro || LINEAR || — || align=right | 1.8 km || 
|-id=589 bgcolor=#d6d6d6
| 332589 ||  || — || September 28, 2008 || Socorro || LINEAR || — || align=right | 4.4 km || 
|-id=590 bgcolor=#d6d6d6
| 332590 ||  || — || September 21, 2008 || Mount Lemmon || Mount Lemmon Survey || — || align=right | 3.2 km || 
|-id=591 bgcolor=#E9E9E9
| 332591 ||  || — || September 22, 2008 || Catalina || CSS || JUN || align=right | 1.7 km || 
|-id=592 bgcolor=#E9E9E9
| 332592 ||  || — || September 22, 2008 || Catalina || CSS || — || align=right | 4.3 km || 
|-id=593 bgcolor=#E9E9E9
| 332593 ||  || — || September 23, 2008 || Mount Lemmon || Mount Lemmon Survey || — || align=right | 2.1 km || 
|-id=594 bgcolor=#d6d6d6
| 332594 ||  || — || September 24, 2008 || Kitt Peak || Spacewatch || — || align=right | 3.3 km || 
|-id=595 bgcolor=#d6d6d6
| 332595 ||  || — || September 26, 2008 || Kitt Peak || Spacewatch || VER || align=right | 2.7 km || 
|-id=596 bgcolor=#d6d6d6
| 332596 ||  || — || September 25, 2008 || Mount Lemmon || Mount Lemmon Survey || — || align=right | 3.4 km || 
|-id=597 bgcolor=#E9E9E9
| 332597 ||  || — || September 28, 2008 || Mount Lemmon || Mount Lemmon Survey || PAD || align=right | 1.9 km || 
|-id=598 bgcolor=#d6d6d6
| 332598 ||  || — || September 28, 2008 || Mount Lemmon || Mount Lemmon Survey || — || align=right | 4.0 km || 
|-id=599 bgcolor=#d6d6d6
| 332599 ||  || — || September 24, 2008 || Kitt Peak || Spacewatch || EOS || align=right | 2.5 km || 
|-id=600 bgcolor=#d6d6d6
| 332600 ||  || — || September 21, 2008 || Kitt Peak || Spacewatch || — || align=right | 3.2 km || 
|}

332601–332700 

|-bgcolor=#d6d6d6
| 332601 ||  || — || September 23, 2008 || Kitt Peak || Spacewatch || — || align=right | 3.1 km || 
|-id=602 bgcolor=#d6d6d6
| 332602 ||  || — || September 25, 2008 || Kitt Peak || Spacewatch || EOS || align=right | 4.6 km || 
|-id=603 bgcolor=#d6d6d6
| 332603 ||  || — || September 24, 2008 || Mount Lemmon || Mount Lemmon Survey || ALA || align=right | 3.8 km || 
|-id=604 bgcolor=#d6d6d6
| 332604 ||  || — || September 28, 2008 || Mount Lemmon || Mount Lemmon Survey || — || align=right | 2.8 km || 
|-id=605 bgcolor=#d6d6d6
| 332605 ||  || — || September 21, 2008 || Kitt Peak || Spacewatch || — || align=right | 3.2 km || 
|-id=606 bgcolor=#d6d6d6
| 332606 ||  || — || September 23, 2008 || Kitt Peak || Spacewatch || — || align=right | 3.2 km || 
|-id=607 bgcolor=#E9E9E9
| 332607 ||  || — || September 23, 2008 || Kitt Peak || Spacewatch || — || align=right | 2.6 km || 
|-id=608 bgcolor=#E9E9E9
| 332608 ||  || — || October 3, 2008 || La Sagra || OAM Obs. || GEF || align=right | 1.6 km || 
|-id=609 bgcolor=#E9E9E9
| 332609 ||  || — || October 3, 2008 || La Sagra || OAM Obs. || — || align=right | 2.6 km || 
|-id=610 bgcolor=#E9E9E9
| 332610 ||  || — || October 1, 2008 || Mount Lemmon || Mount Lemmon Survey || — || align=right | 2.4 km || 
|-id=611 bgcolor=#d6d6d6
| 332611 ||  || — || October 1, 2003 || Kitt Peak || Spacewatch || — || align=right | 2.7 km || 
|-id=612 bgcolor=#d6d6d6
| 332612 ||  || — || October 1, 2008 || Mount Lemmon || Mount Lemmon Survey || — || align=right | 2.7 km || 
|-id=613 bgcolor=#d6d6d6
| 332613 ||  || — || October 1, 2008 || Kitt Peak || Spacewatch || — || align=right | 3.0 km || 
|-id=614 bgcolor=#d6d6d6
| 332614 ||  || — || October 1, 2008 || Mount Lemmon || Mount Lemmon Survey || ANF || align=right | 1.7 km || 
|-id=615 bgcolor=#d6d6d6
| 332615 ||  || — || October 2, 2008 || Kitt Peak || Spacewatch || — || align=right | 5.2 km || 
|-id=616 bgcolor=#d6d6d6
| 332616 ||  || — || October 2, 2008 || Kitt Peak || Spacewatch || MRC || align=right | 2.7 km || 
|-id=617 bgcolor=#E9E9E9
| 332617 ||  || — || October 4, 2008 || Catalina || CSS || — || align=right | 2.2 km || 
|-id=618 bgcolor=#E9E9E9
| 332618 ||  || — || October 6, 2008 || Kitt Peak || Spacewatch || MRX || align=right | 1.2 km || 
|-id=619 bgcolor=#d6d6d6
| 332619 ||  || — || October 6, 2008 || Kitt Peak || Spacewatch || — || align=right | 2.8 km || 
|-id=620 bgcolor=#d6d6d6
| 332620 ||  || — || October 6, 2008 || Kitt Peak || Spacewatch || HYG || align=right | 3.1 km || 
|-id=621 bgcolor=#d6d6d6
| 332621 ||  || — || October 6, 2008 || Kitt Peak || Spacewatch || VER || align=right | 2.9 km || 
|-id=622 bgcolor=#d6d6d6
| 332622 ||  || — || October 6, 2008 || Catalina || CSS || EUP || align=right | 6.4 km || 
|-id=623 bgcolor=#d6d6d6
| 332623 ||  || — || October 6, 2008 || Catalina || CSS || — || align=right | 3.2 km || 
|-id=624 bgcolor=#E9E9E9
| 332624 ||  || — || October 6, 2008 || Catalina || CSS || MRX || align=right | 1.4 km || 
|-id=625 bgcolor=#d6d6d6
| 332625 ||  || — || October 6, 2008 || Kitt Peak || Spacewatch || — || align=right | 3.5 km || 
|-id=626 bgcolor=#d6d6d6
| 332626 ||  || — || February 14, 2005 || Catalina || CSS || EOS || align=right | 2.3 km || 
|-id=627 bgcolor=#d6d6d6
| 332627 ||  || — || October 8, 2008 || Mount Lemmon || Mount Lemmon Survey || TRP || align=right | 2.9 km || 
|-id=628 bgcolor=#d6d6d6
| 332628 ||  || — || October 8, 2008 || Mount Lemmon || Mount Lemmon Survey || — || align=right | 3.6 km || 
|-id=629 bgcolor=#d6d6d6
| 332629 ||  || — || September 23, 2008 || Kitt Peak || Spacewatch || HYG || align=right | 3.3 km || 
|-id=630 bgcolor=#E9E9E9
| 332630 ||  || — || October 4, 2008 || Catalina || CSS || — || align=right | 3.0 km || 
|-id=631 bgcolor=#E9E9E9
| 332631 ||  || — || October 6, 2008 || Socorro || LINEAR || JUN || align=right | 1.5 km || 
|-id=632 bgcolor=#d6d6d6
| 332632 Pharos ||  ||  || October 22, 2008 || Vallemare di Borbona || V. S. Casulli || — || align=right | 3.3 km || 
|-id=633 bgcolor=#d6d6d6
| 332633 ||  || — || October 24, 2008 || Tzec Maun || E. Schwab || — || align=right | 3.4 km || 
|-id=634 bgcolor=#d6d6d6
| 332634 ||  || — || October 24, 2008 || Sierra Stars || F. Tozzi || — || align=right | 4.9 km || 
|-id=635 bgcolor=#d6d6d6
| 332635 ||  || — || October 18, 2008 || Kitt Peak || Spacewatch || K-2 || align=right | 1.4 km || 
|-id=636 bgcolor=#d6d6d6
| 332636 ||  || — || October 20, 2008 || Kitt Peak || Spacewatch || — || align=right | 2.8 km || 
|-id=637 bgcolor=#d6d6d6
| 332637 ||  || — || October 21, 2008 || Kitt Peak || Spacewatch || — || align=right | 3.1 km || 
|-id=638 bgcolor=#d6d6d6
| 332638 ||  || — || October 21, 2008 || Kitt Peak || Spacewatch || — || align=right | 4.0 km || 
|-id=639 bgcolor=#d6d6d6
| 332639 ||  || — || October 22, 2008 || Kitt Peak || Spacewatch || — || align=right | 2.4 km || 
|-id=640 bgcolor=#d6d6d6
| 332640 ||  || — || October 22, 2008 || Mount Lemmon || Mount Lemmon Survey || — || align=right | 3.3 km || 
|-id=641 bgcolor=#E9E9E9
| 332641 ||  || — || October 27, 2008 || Socorro || LINEAR || — || align=right | 2.2 km || 
|-id=642 bgcolor=#d6d6d6
| 332642 ||  || — || October 28, 2008 || Socorro || LINEAR || — || align=right | 5.8 km || 
|-id=643 bgcolor=#E9E9E9
| 332643 ||  || — || October 21, 2008 || Kitt Peak || Spacewatch || — || align=right | 2.9 km || 
|-id=644 bgcolor=#d6d6d6
| 332644 ||  || — || October 22, 2008 || Kitt Peak || Spacewatch || HYG || align=right | 3.5 km || 
|-id=645 bgcolor=#d6d6d6
| 332645 ||  || — || October 22, 2008 || Kitt Peak || Spacewatch || THM || align=right | 2.3 km || 
|-id=646 bgcolor=#d6d6d6
| 332646 ||  || — || October 22, 2008 || Kitt Peak || Spacewatch || — || align=right | 4.4 km || 
|-id=647 bgcolor=#d6d6d6
| 332647 ||  || — || October 23, 2008 || Kitt Peak || Spacewatch || THM || align=right | 2.9 km || 
|-id=648 bgcolor=#d6d6d6
| 332648 ||  || — || October 26, 2008 || Kitt Peak || Spacewatch || THM || align=right | 2.3 km || 
|-id=649 bgcolor=#E9E9E9
| 332649 ||  || — || October 26, 2008 || Socorro || LINEAR || MRX || align=right | 1.2 km || 
|-id=650 bgcolor=#d6d6d6
| 332650 ||  || — || October 28, 2008 || Socorro || LINEAR || VER || align=right | 5.0 km || 
|-id=651 bgcolor=#d6d6d6
| 332651 ||  || — || October 24, 2008 || Catalina || CSS || — || align=right | 6.0 km || 
|-id=652 bgcolor=#d6d6d6
| 332652 ||  || — || October 3, 2002 || Palomar || NEAT || — || align=right | 4.1 km || 
|-id=653 bgcolor=#d6d6d6
| 332653 ||  || — || October 27, 2008 || Mount Lemmon || Mount Lemmon Survey || — || align=right | 3.5 km || 
|-id=654 bgcolor=#d6d6d6
| 332654 ||  || — || October 24, 2008 || Kitt Peak || Spacewatch || — || align=right | 2.6 km || 
|-id=655 bgcolor=#E9E9E9
| 332655 ||  || — || November 2, 2008 || Catalina || CSS || JUN || align=right | 1.6 km || 
|-id=656 bgcolor=#d6d6d6
| 332656 ||  || — || November 4, 2008 || Kitt Peak || Spacewatch || — || align=right | 3.2 km || 
|-id=657 bgcolor=#E9E9E9
| 332657 ||  || — || November 3, 2008 || Mount Lemmon || Mount Lemmon Survey || GER || align=right | 1.4 km || 
|-id=658 bgcolor=#E9E9E9
| 332658 ||  || — || November 6, 2008 || Catalina || CSS || — || align=right | 2.9 km || 
|-id=659 bgcolor=#d6d6d6
| 332659 ||  || — || November 17, 2008 || Kitt Peak || Spacewatch || — || align=right | 4.9 km || 
|-id=660 bgcolor=#d6d6d6
| 332660 ||  || — || November 17, 2008 || Kitt Peak || Spacewatch || HYG || align=right | 3.2 km || 
|-id=661 bgcolor=#d6d6d6
| 332661 ||  || — || November 17, 2008 || Kitt Peak || Spacewatch || HYG || align=right | 2.8 km || 
|-id=662 bgcolor=#d6d6d6
| 332662 ||  || — || November 17, 2008 || Kitt Peak || Spacewatch || THM || align=right | 2.5 km || 
|-id=663 bgcolor=#FA8072
| 332663 ||  || — || November 19, 2008 || Mount Lemmon || Mount Lemmon Survey || — || align=right data-sort-value="0.60" | 600 m || 
|-id=664 bgcolor=#E9E9E9
| 332664 ||  || — || November 19, 2008 || Socorro || LINEAR || — || align=right | 2.7 km || 
|-id=665 bgcolor=#d6d6d6
| 332665 ||  || — || November 20, 2008 || Kitt Peak || Spacewatch || — || align=right | 4.2 km || 
|-id=666 bgcolor=#d6d6d6
| 332666 ||  || — || November 27, 2008 || Antares || ARO || — || align=right | 4.0 km || 
|-id=667 bgcolor=#d6d6d6
| 332667 ||  || — || July 31, 2008 || Mount Lemmon || Mount Lemmon Survey || — || align=right | 3.3 km || 
|-id=668 bgcolor=#d6d6d6
| 332668 ||  || — || December 19, 2008 || Socorro || LINEAR || — || align=right | 4.1 km || 
|-id=669 bgcolor=#fefefe
| 332669 ||  || — || December 29, 2008 || Kitt Peak || Spacewatch || — || align=right data-sort-value="0.89" | 890 m || 
|-id=670 bgcolor=#fefefe
| 332670 ||  || — || October 13, 1993 || Kitt Peak || Spacewatch || — || align=right data-sort-value="0.56" | 560 m || 
|-id=671 bgcolor=#fefefe
| 332671 ||  || — || September 10, 2007 || Kitt Peak || Spacewatch || NYS || align=right data-sort-value="0.85" | 850 m || 
|-id=672 bgcolor=#E9E9E9
| 332672 ||  || — || October 11, 2007 || Catalina || CSS || — || align=right | 1.6 km || 
|-id=673 bgcolor=#d6d6d6
| 332673 ||  || — || January 16, 2009 || Kitt Peak || Spacewatch || — || align=right | 3.6 km || 
|-id=674 bgcolor=#E9E9E9
| 332674 ||  || — || January 16, 2009 || Kitt Peak || Spacewatch || GEF || align=right | 1.4 km || 
|-id=675 bgcolor=#fefefe
| 332675 ||  || — || September 11, 2007 || Mount Lemmon || Mount Lemmon Survey || NYS || align=right data-sort-value="0.76" | 760 m || 
|-id=676 bgcolor=#d6d6d6
| 332676 ||  || — || January 29, 2009 || Mount Lemmon || Mount Lemmon Survey || URS || align=right | 4.5 km || 
|-id=677 bgcolor=#d6d6d6
| 332677 ||  || — || October 10, 2007 || Kitt Peak || Spacewatch || — || align=right | 2.1 km || 
|-id=678 bgcolor=#fefefe
| 332678 ||  || — || February 1, 2009 || Kitt Peak || Spacewatch || — || align=right data-sort-value="0.99" | 990 m || 
|-id=679 bgcolor=#fefefe
| 332679 ||  || — || February 14, 2009 || Kitt Peak || Spacewatch || MAS || align=right data-sort-value="0.88" | 880 m || 
|-id=680 bgcolor=#fefefe
| 332680 ||  || — || November 18, 2003 || Kitt Peak || Spacewatch || NYS || align=right data-sort-value="0.96" | 960 m || 
|-id=681 bgcolor=#fefefe
| 332681 ||  || — || September 4, 2007 || Mount Lemmon || Mount Lemmon Survey || MAS || align=right data-sort-value="0.67" | 670 m || 
|-id=682 bgcolor=#E9E9E9
| 332682 ||  || — || October 10, 2007 || Catalina || CSS || ADE || align=right | 1.9 km || 
|-id=683 bgcolor=#E9E9E9
| 332683 ||  || — || February 20, 2009 || Kitt Peak || Spacewatch || MRX || align=right | 1.1 km || 
|-id=684 bgcolor=#fefefe
| 332684 ||  || — || February 20, 2009 || Siding Spring || SSS || H || align=right data-sort-value="0.65" | 650 m || 
|-id=685 bgcolor=#C7FF8F
| 332685 ||  || — || April 19, 2009 || Kitt Peak || Spacewatch || centaur || align=right | 33 km || 
|-id=686 bgcolor=#fefefe
| 332686 ||  || — || July 19, 2009 || La Sagra || OAM Obs. || FLO || align=right data-sort-value="0.59" | 590 m || 
|-id=687 bgcolor=#FA8072
| 332687 ||  || — || July 19, 2009 || Siding Spring || SSS || — || align=right | 1.5 km || 
|-id=688 bgcolor=#fefefe
| 332688 ||  || — || July 27, 2009 || Catalina || CSS || V || align=right data-sort-value="0.63" | 630 m || 
|-id=689 bgcolor=#fefefe
| 332689 ||  || — || August 2, 2009 || Siding Spring || SSS || — || align=right | 1.1 km || 
|-id=690 bgcolor=#fefefe
| 332690 ||  || — || August 15, 2009 || Catalina || CSS || — || align=right | 1.0 km || 
|-id=691 bgcolor=#fefefe
| 332691 ||  || — || August 18, 2009 || Črni Vrh || Črni Vrh || — || align=right data-sort-value="0.64" | 640 m || 
|-id=692 bgcolor=#fefefe
| 332692 ||  || — || August 21, 2009 || Socorro || LINEAR || — || align=right | 1.4 km || 
|-id=693 bgcolor=#fefefe
| 332693 ||  || — || August 28, 2009 || Catalina || CSS || NYS || align=right data-sort-value="0.81" | 810 m || 
|-id=694 bgcolor=#E9E9E9
| 332694 ||  || — || August 19, 2009 || Kitt Peak || Spacewatch || — || align=right | 1.8 km || 
|-id=695 bgcolor=#E9E9E9
| 332695 ||  || — || September 10, 2009 || La Sagra || OAM Obs. || — || align=right | 2.2 km || 
|-id=696 bgcolor=#fefefe
| 332696 ||  || — || September 14, 2009 || La Sagra || OAM Obs. || — || align=right data-sort-value="0.75" | 750 m || 
|-id=697 bgcolor=#fefefe
| 332697 ||  || — || September 14, 2009 || La Sagra || OAM Obs. || NYS || align=right data-sort-value="0.76" | 760 m || 
|-id=698 bgcolor=#fefefe
| 332698 ||  || — || October 4, 2006 || Mount Lemmon || Mount Lemmon Survey || — || align=right | 1.00 km || 
|-id=699 bgcolor=#fefefe
| 332699 ||  || — || September 15, 2009 || Kitt Peak || Spacewatch || V || align=right data-sort-value="0.57" | 570 m || 
|-id=700 bgcolor=#fefefe
| 332700 ||  || — || September 14, 2009 || Kitt Peak || Spacewatch || — || align=right | 1.0 km || 
|}

332701–332800 

|-bgcolor=#E9E9E9
| 332701 ||  || — || September 14, 2009 || Kitt Peak || Spacewatch || HEN || align=right data-sort-value="0.89" | 890 m || 
|-id=702 bgcolor=#fefefe
| 332702 ||  || — || September 15, 2009 || Kitt Peak || Spacewatch || V || align=right data-sort-value="0.83" | 830 m || 
|-id=703 bgcolor=#fefefe
| 332703 ||  || — || September 15, 2009 || Kitt Peak || Spacewatch || NYS || align=right data-sort-value="0.61" | 610 m || 
|-id=704 bgcolor=#E9E9E9
| 332704 ||  || — || October 29, 2005 || Mount Lemmon || Mount Lemmon Survey || HEN || align=right | 1.0 km || 
|-id=705 bgcolor=#d6d6d6
| 332705 ||  || — || September 15, 2009 || Kitt Peak || Spacewatch || THM || align=right | 3.1 km || 
|-id=706 bgcolor=#fefefe
| 332706 Karlheidlas ||  ||  || September 13, 2009 || ESA OGS || ESA OGS || FLO || align=right data-sort-value="0.84" | 840 m || 
|-id=707 bgcolor=#fefefe
| 332707 ||  || — || September 12, 2009 || Kitt Peak || Spacewatch || MAS || align=right data-sort-value="0.71" | 710 m || 
|-id=708 bgcolor=#fefefe
| 332708 ||  || — || September 16, 2009 || Kitt Peak || Spacewatch || — || align=right data-sort-value="0.85" | 850 m || 
|-id=709 bgcolor=#fefefe
| 332709 ||  || — || September 17, 2009 || Catalina || CSS || — || align=right | 1.2 km || 
|-id=710 bgcolor=#E9E9E9
| 332710 ||  || — || September 17, 2009 || Kitt Peak || Spacewatch || — || align=right | 2.4 km || 
|-id=711 bgcolor=#E9E9E9
| 332711 ||  || — || September 17, 2009 || Kitt Peak || Spacewatch || — || align=right data-sort-value="0.95" | 950 m || 
|-id=712 bgcolor=#fefefe
| 332712 ||  || — || April 11, 2005 || Mount Lemmon || Mount Lemmon Survey || critical || align=right data-sort-value="0.59" | 590 m || 
|-id=713 bgcolor=#fefefe
| 332713 ||  || — || September 18, 2009 || Mount Lemmon || Mount Lemmon Survey || FLO || align=right data-sort-value="0.61" | 610 m || 
|-id=714 bgcolor=#fefefe
| 332714 ||  || — || September 18, 2009 || Kitt Peak || Spacewatch || — || align=right data-sort-value="0.83" | 830 m || 
|-id=715 bgcolor=#FA8072
| 332715 ||  || — || September 18, 2009 || Mount Lemmon || Mount Lemmon Survey || — || align=right data-sort-value="0.79" | 790 m || 
|-id=716 bgcolor=#fefefe
| 332716 ||  || — || September 19, 2009 || Kitt Peak || Spacewatch || — || align=right data-sort-value="0.92" | 920 m || 
|-id=717 bgcolor=#fefefe
| 332717 ||  || — || September 28, 2009 || Wildberg || R. Apitzsch || V || align=right data-sort-value="0.67" | 670 m || 
|-id=718 bgcolor=#fefefe
| 332718 ||  || — || September 19, 2009 || Purple Mountain || PMO NEO || V || align=right data-sort-value="0.75" | 750 m || 
|-id=719 bgcolor=#fefefe
| 332719 ||  || — || September 23, 2009 || Catalina || CSS || — || align=right | 1.4 km || 
|-id=720 bgcolor=#E9E9E9
| 332720 ||  || — || September 15, 2009 || Kitt Peak || Spacewatch || — || align=right | 2.6 km || 
|-id=721 bgcolor=#E9E9E9
| 332721 ||  || — || September 25, 2009 || Kitt Peak || Spacewatch || — || align=right | 1.0 km || 
|-id=722 bgcolor=#E9E9E9
| 332722 ||  || — || September 22, 2009 || Mount Lemmon || Mount Lemmon Survey || ADE || align=right | 3.7 km || 
|-id=723 bgcolor=#fefefe
| 332723 ||  || — || September 23, 2009 || Kitt Peak || Spacewatch || V || align=right data-sort-value="0.80" | 800 m || 
|-id=724 bgcolor=#E9E9E9
| 332724 ||  || — || September 25, 2009 || Kitt Peak || Spacewatch || — || align=right | 2.1 km || 
|-id=725 bgcolor=#E9E9E9
| 332725 ||  || — || September 25, 2009 || Kitt Peak || Spacewatch || — || align=right | 1.7 km || 
|-id=726 bgcolor=#fefefe
| 332726 ||  || — || March 12, 2008 || Kitt Peak || Spacewatch || — || align=right data-sort-value="0.83" | 830 m || 
|-id=727 bgcolor=#E9E9E9
| 332727 ||  || — || September 25, 2009 || Kitt Peak || Spacewatch || — || align=right | 1.2 km || 
|-id=728 bgcolor=#E9E9E9
| 332728 ||  || — || September 25, 2009 || Kitt Peak || Spacewatch || — || align=right | 2.1 km || 
|-id=729 bgcolor=#fefefe
| 332729 ||  || — || September 25, 2009 || Kitt Peak || Spacewatch || — || align=right data-sort-value="0.83" | 830 m || 
|-id=730 bgcolor=#d6d6d6
| 332730 ||  || — || September 25, 2009 || Kitt Peak || Spacewatch || — || align=right | 3.4 km || 
|-id=731 bgcolor=#E9E9E9
| 332731 ||  || — || September 19, 2009 || Kitt Peak || Spacewatch || — || align=right data-sort-value="0.97" | 970 m || 
|-id=732 bgcolor=#fefefe
| 332732 ||  || — || September 20, 2009 || Kitt Peak || Spacewatch || NYS || align=right data-sort-value="0.70" | 700 m || 
|-id=733 bgcolor=#fefefe
| 332733 Drolshagen ||  ||  || September 21, 2009 || La Sagra || OAM Obs. || — || align=right | 1.3 km || 
|-id=734 bgcolor=#E9E9E9
| 332734 ||  || — || September 26, 2009 || Kitt Peak || Spacewatch || — || align=right data-sort-value="0.89" | 890 m || 
|-id=735 bgcolor=#E9E9E9
| 332735 ||  || — || April 11, 2007 || Kitt Peak || Spacewatch || — || align=right | 3.5 km || 
|-id=736 bgcolor=#d6d6d6
| 332736 ||  || — || September 22, 2009 || Mount Lemmon || Mount Lemmon Survey || — || align=right | 4.1 km || 
|-id=737 bgcolor=#E9E9E9
| 332737 ||  || — || September 17, 2009 || Kitt Peak || Spacewatch || — || align=right | 1.2 km || 
|-id=738 bgcolor=#fefefe
| 332738 ||  || — || September 30, 2009 || Mount Lemmon || Mount Lemmon Survey || KLI || align=right | 2.5 km || 
|-id=739 bgcolor=#fefefe
| 332739 ||  || — || September 20, 2009 || Mount Lemmon || Mount Lemmon Survey || — || align=right data-sort-value="0.81" | 810 m || 
|-id=740 bgcolor=#E9E9E9
| 332740 ||  || — || October 10, 2009 || La Sagra || OAM Obs. || — || align=right | 3.1 km || 
|-id=741 bgcolor=#fefefe
| 332741 ||  || — || September 26, 1998 || Socorro || LINEAR || — || align=right | 1.2 km || 
|-id=742 bgcolor=#fefefe
| 332742 ||  || — || October 9, 2009 || Catalina || CSS || — || align=right data-sort-value="0.81" | 810 m || 
|-id=743 bgcolor=#fefefe
| 332743 ||  || — || October 10, 2009 || La Sagra || OAM Obs. || MAS || align=right data-sort-value="0.78" | 780 m || 
|-id=744 bgcolor=#E9E9E9
| 332744 ||  || — || October 14, 2009 || La Sagra || OAM Obs. || — || align=right | 1.5 km || 
|-id=745 bgcolor=#fefefe
| 332745 ||  || — || October 11, 2009 || Mount Lemmon || Mount Lemmon Survey || — || align=right | 1.0 km || 
|-id=746 bgcolor=#fefefe
| 332746 ||  || — || October 11, 2009 || La Sagra || OAM Obs. || — || align=right data-sort-value="0.88" | 880 m || 
|-id=747 bgcolor=#E9E9E9
| 332747 ||  || — || October 14, 2009 || La Sagra || OAM Obs. || — || align=right | 1.5 km || 
|-id=748 bgcolor=#E9E9E9
| 332748 ||  || — || October 14, 2009 || La Sagra || OAM Obs. || — || align=right | 2.5 km || 
|-id=749 bgcolor=#fefefe
| 332749 ||  || — || December 15, 2006 || Mount Lemmon || Mount Lemmon Survey || — || align=right data-sort-value="0.92" | 920 m || 
|-id=750 bgcolor=#E9E9E9
| 332750 ||  || — || October 15, 2009 || La Sagra || OAM Obs. || GEF || align=right | 2.1 km || 
|-id=751 bgcolor=#fefefe
| 332751 ||  || — || October 12, 2009 || La Sagra || OAM Obs. || — || align=right | 1.0 km || 
|-id=752 bgcolor=#d6d6d6
| 332752 ||  || — || October 15, 2009 || Kitt Peak || Spacewatch || — || align=right | 3.2 km || 
|-id=753 bgcolor=#E9E9E9
| 332753 ||  || — || October 2, 2009 || Mount Lemmon || Mount Lemmon Survey || — || align=right | 1.6 km || 
|-id=754 bgcolor=#fefefe
| 332754 ||  || — || October 16, 2009 || Mount Lemmon || Mount Lemmon Survey || NYS || align=right data-sort-value="0.70" | 700 m || 
|-id=755 bgcolor=#E9E9E9
| 332755 ||  || — || October 20, 2009 || Bisei SG Center || BATTeRS || — || align=right | 2.9 km || 
|-id=756 bgcolor=#d6d6d6
| 332756 ||  || — || October 22, 2009 || Mount Lemmon || Mount Lemmon Survey || — || align=right | 2.3 km || 
|-id=757 bgcolor=#E9E9E9
| 332757 ||  || — || October 18, 2009 || Mount Lemmon || Mount Lemmon Survey || MAR || align=right | 1.3 km || 
|-id=758 bgcolor=#E9E9E9
| 332758 ||  || — || October 25, 2005 || Kitt Peak || Spacewatch || — || align=right | 1.6 km || 
|-id=759 bgcolor=#E9E9E9
| 332759 ||  || — || October 21, 2009 || Mount Lemmon || Mount Lemmon Survey || — || align=right | 1.6 km || 
|-id=760 bgcolor=#d6d6d6
| 332760 ||  || — || January 12, 2005 || Uccle || T. Pauwels || — || align=right | 3.5 km || 
|-id=761 bgcolor=#d6d6d6
| 332761 ||  || — || October 23, 2009 || Mount Lemmon || Mount Lemmon Survey || KAR || align=right | 1.1 km || 
|-id=762 bgcolor=#E9E9E9
| 332762 ||  || — || October 23, 2009 || Mount Lemmon || Mount Lemmon Survey || — || align=right | 1.3 km || 
|-id=763 bgcolor=#d6d6d6
| 332763 ||  || — || October 23, 2009 || Mount Lemmon || Mount Lemmon Survey || KOR || align=right | 1.5 km || 
|-id=764 bgcolor=#fefefe
| 332764 ||  || — || October 24, 2009 || Catalina || CSS || — || align=right | 1.3 km || 
|-id=765 bgcolor=#d6d6d6
| 332765 ||  || — || October 18, 2009 || Catalina || CSS || — || align=right | 3.9 km || 
|-id=766 bgcolor=#d6d6d6
| 332766 ||  || — || October 24, 2009 || Catalina || CSS || — || align=right | 5.3 km || 
|-id=767 bgcolor=#E9E9E9
| 332767 ||  || — || October 24, 2009 || Kitt Peak || Spacewatch || HOF || align=right | 3.1 km || 
|-id=768 bgcolor=#fefefe
| 332768 ||  || — || October 21, 2009 || Catalina || CSS || NYS || align=right data-sort-value="0.80" | 800 m || 
|-id=769 bgcolor=#E9E9E9
| 332769 ||  || — || October 22, 2009 || Catalina || CSS || — || align=right | 2.7 km || 
|-id=770 bgcolor=#d6d6d6
| 332770 ||  || — || October 26, 2009 || Kitt Peak || Spacewatch || — || align=right | 2.9 km || 
|-id=771 bgcolor=#E9E9E9
| 332771 ||  || — || October 21, 2009 || Mount Lemmon || Mount Lemmon Survey || AGN || align=right | 1.4 km || 
|-id=772 bgcolor=#E9E9E9
| 332772 ||  || — || February 23, 2007 || Kitt Peak || Spacewatch || WIT || align=right | 1.2 km || 
|-id=773 bgcolor=#E9E9E9
| 332773 ||  || — || November 8, 2009 || Mount Lemmon || Mount Lemmon Survey || HEN || align=right | 1.0 km || 
|-id=774 bgcolor=#E9E9E9
| 332774 ||  || — || February 21, 2007 || Mount Lemmon || Mount Lemmon Survey || — || align=right | 1.1 km || 
|-id=775 bgcolor=#FFC2E0
| 332775 ||  || — || November 11, 2009 || Catalina || CSS || APO || align=right data-sort-value="0.47" | 470 m || 
|-id=776 bgcolor=#d6d6d6
| 332776 ||  || — || November 9, 2009 || Mount Lemmon || Mount Lemmon Survey || — || align=right | 3.2 km || 
|-id=777 bgcolor=#d6d6d6
| 332777 ||  || — || November 9, 2009 || Mount Lemmon || Mount Lemmon Survey || EOS || align=right | 3.1 km || 
|-id=778 bgcolor=#d6d6d6
| 332778 ||  || — || November 8, 2009 || Kitt Peak || Spacewatch || BRA || align=right | 1.7 km || 
|-id=779 bgcolor=#E9E9E9
| 332779 ||  || — || November 8, 2009 || Kitt Peak || Spacewatch || — || align=right | 1.5 km || 
|-id=780 bgcolor=#d6d6d6
| 332780 ||  || — || November 8, 2009 || Kitt Peak || Spacewatch || — || align=right | 4.9 km || 
|-id=781 bgcolor=#d6d6d6
| 332781 ||  || — || November 11, 2009 || Socorro || LINEAR || — || align=right | 4.2 km || 
|-id=782 bgcolor=#E9E9E9
| 332782 ||  || — || November 9, 2009 || Mount Lemmon || Mount Lemmon Survey || — || align=right | 1.4 km || 
|-id=783 bgcolor=#fefefe
| 332783 ||  || — || November 10, 2009 || Kitt Peak || Spacewatch || NYS || align=right | 1.8 km || 
|-id=784 bgcolor=#fefefe
| 332784 ||  || — || November 8, 2009 || Kitt Peak || Spacewatch || MAS || align=right data-sort-value="0.86" | 860 m || 
|-id=785 bgcolor=#fefefe
| 332785 ||  || — || November 9, 2009 || Kitt Peak || Spacewatch || — || align=right | 1.2 km || 
|-id=786 bgcolor=#d6d6d6
| 332786 ||  || — || October 15, 2009 || La Sagra || OAM Obs. || — || align=right | 5.2 km || 
|-id=787 bgcolor=#E9E9E9
| 332787 ||  || — || November 9, 2009 || Catalina || CSS || — || align=right | 2.1 km || 
|-id=788 bgcolor=#d6d6d6
| 332788 ||  || — || November 14, 2009 || La Sagra || OAM Obs. || — || align=right | 5.1 km || 
|-id=789 bgcolor=#E9E9E9
| 332789 ||  || — || November 8, 2009 || Catalina || CSS || — || align=right | 1.5 km || 
|-id=790 bgcolor=#E9E9E9
| 332790 ||  || — || February 14, 2002 || Kitt Peak || Spacewatch || — || align=right | 2.0 km || 
|-id=791 bgcolor=#E9E9E9
| 332791 ||  || — || November 18, 2009 || Socorro || LINEAR || — || align=right | 2.1 km || 
|-id=792 bgcolor=#E9E9E9
| 332792 ||  || — || November 18, 2009 || Kitt Peak || Spacewatch || — || align=right | 1.2 km || 
|-id=793 bgcolor=#d6d6d6
| 332793 ||  || — || November 16, 2009 || Kitt Peak || Spacewatch || EOS || align=right | 2.3 km || 
|-id=794 bgcolor=#E9E9E9
| 332794 ||  || — || November 17, 2009 || Kitt Peak || Spacewatch || RAF || align=right | 1.1 km || 
|-id=795 bgcolor=#E9E9E9
| 332795 ||  || — || November 17, 2009 || Mount Lemmon || Mount Lemmon Survey || — || align=right | 1.7 km || 
|-id=796 bgcolor=#E9E9E9
| 332796 ||  || — || November 16, 2009 || Mount Lemmon || Mount Lemmon Survey || — || align=right | 3.0 km || 
|-id=797 bgcolor=#E9E9E9
| 332797 ||  || — || November 16, 2009 || Mount Lemmon || Mount Lemmon Survey || HOF || align=right | 2.6 km || 
|-id=798 bgcolor=#E9E9E9
| 332798 ||  || — || April 14, 2007 || Mount Lemmon || Mount Lemmon Survey || — || align=right | 1.9 km || 
|-id=799 bgcolor=#d6d6d6
| 332799 ||  || — || November 18, 2009 || Kitt Peak || Spacewatch || — || align=right | 3.8 km || 
|-id=800 bgcolor=#d6d6d6
| 332800 ||  || — || December 3, 2004 || Kitt Peak || Spacewatch || — || align=right | 3.2 km || 
|}

332801–332900 

|-bgcolor=#E9E9E9
| 332801 ||  || — || November 10, 2009 || Kitt Peak || Spacewatch || NEM || align=right | 2.3 km || 
|-id=802 bgcolor=#E9E9E9
| 332802 ||  || — || November 18, 2009 || Kitt Peak || Spacewatch || MRX || align=right | 1.2 km || 
|-id=803 bgcolor=#d6d6d6
| 332803 ||  || — || November 19, 2009 || Kitt Peak || Spacewatch || EOS || align=right | 2.6 km || 
|-id=804 bgcolor=#E9E9E9
| 332804 ||  || — || November 19, 2009 || Kitt Peak || Spacewatch || — || align=right | 1.3 km || 
|-id=805 bgcolor=#d6d6d6
| 332805 ||  || — || November 10, 2009 || Kitt Peak || Spacewatch || — || align=right | 4.1 km || 
|-id=806 bgcolor=#E9E9E9
| 332806 ||  || — || November 19, 2009 || Mount Lemmon || Mount Lemmon Survey || — || align=right | 3.0 km || 
|-id=807 bgcolor=#E9E9E9
| 332807 ||  || — || November 20, 2009 || Mount Lemmon || Mount Lemmon Survey || — || align=right | 2.1 km || 
|-id=808 bgcolor=#d6d6d6
| 332808 ||  || — || November 8, 2009 || Mount Lemmon || Mount Lemmon Survey || — || align=right | 3.6 km || 
|-id=809 bgcolor=#d6d6d6
| 332809 ||  || — || November 21, 2009 || Mount Lemmon || Mount Lemmon Survey || EOS || align=right | 2.5 km || 
|-id=810 bgcolor=#d6d6d6
| 332810 ||  || — || January 23, 2006 || Kitt Peak || Spacewatch || — || align=right | 2.8 km || 
|-id=811 bgcolor=#E9E9E9
| 332811 ||  || — || November 22, 2009 || Mount Lemmon || Mount Lemmon Survey || — || align=right | 1.1 km || 
|-id=812 bgcolor=#E9E9E9
| 332812 ||  || — || November 23, 2009 || Mount Lemmon || Mount Lemmon Survey || KON || align=right | 3.3 km || 
|-id=813 bgcolor=#E9E9E9
| 332813 ||  || — || March 16, 2007 || Catalina || CSS || — || align=right | 3.5 km || 
|-id=814 bgcolor=#d6d6d6
| 332814 ||  || — || November 25, 2009 || La Sagra || OAM Obs. || — || align=right | 4.5 km || 
|-id=815 bgcolor=#d6d6d6
| 332815 ||  || — || October 25, 2003 || Kitt Peak || Spacewatch || — || align=right | 5.4 km || 
|-id=816 bgcolor=#E9E9E9
| 332816 ||  || — || March 15, 2007 || Mount Lemmon || Mount Lemmon Survey || — || align=right | 2.7 km || 
|-id=817 bgcolor=#fefefe
| 332817 ||  || — || September 9, 2002 || Haleakala || NEAT || — || align=right | 1.0 km || 
|-id=818 bgcolor=#E9E9E9
| 332818 ||  || — || November 23, 2009 || Kitt Peak || Spacewatch || MAR || align=right | 1.6 km || 
|-id=819 bgcolor=#d6d6d6
| 332819 ||  || — || November 8, 2009 || Mount Lemmon || Mount Lemmon Survey || — || align=right | 4.9 km || 
|-id=820 bgcolor=#d6d6d6
| 332820 ||  || — || November 11, 2004 || Kitt Peak || Spacewatch || — || align=right | 2.8 km || 
|-id=821 bgcolor=#d6d6d6
| 332821 ||  || — || November 16, 2009 || Mount Lemmon || Mount Lemmon Survey || — || align=right | 3.4 km || 
|-id=822 bgcolor=#d6d6d6
| 332822 ||  || — || November 17, 2009 || Kitt Peak || Spacewatch || — || align=right | 4.6 km || 
|-id=823 bgcolor=#d6d6d6
| 332823 ||  || — || November 21, 2009 || Kitt Peak || Spacewatch || — || align=right | 4.0 km || 
|-id=824 bgcolor=#E9E9E9
| 332824 ||  || — || December 15, 2009 || Mount Lemmon || Mount Lemmon Survey || — || align=right | 2.5 km || 
|-id=825 bgcolor=#d6d6d6
| 332825 ||  || — || December 15, 2009 || Mount Lemmon || Mount Lemmon Survey || HYG || align=right | 4.6 km || 
|-id=826 bgcolor=#E9E9E9
| 332826 ||  || — || December 15, 2009 || Mount Lemmon || Mount Lemmon Survey || — || align=right | 2.4 km || 
|-id=827 bgcolor=#d6d6d6
| 332827 ||  || — || December 18, 2009 || Mount Lemmon || Mount Lemmon Survey || LUT || align=right | 5.0 km || 
|-id=828 bgcolor=#d6d6d6
| 332828 ||  || — || December 19, 2009 || Kitt Peak || Spacewatch || — || align=right | 4.6 km || 
|-id=829 bgcolor=#d6d6d6
| 332829 ||  || — || January 5, 2010 || Kitt Peak || Spacewatch || — || align=right | 5.8 km || 
|-id=830 bgcolor=#d6d6d6
| 332830 ||  || — || January 6, 2010 || Kitt Peak || Spacewatch || — || align=right | 4.1 km || 
|-id=831 bgcolor=#d6d6d6
| 332831 ||  || — || November 24, 2003 || Kitt Peak || Spacewatch || — || align=right | 4.3 km || 
|-id=832 bgcolor=#d6d6d6
| 332832 ||  || — || January 6, 2010 || Kitt Peak || Spacewatch || — || align=right | 5.3 km || 
|-id=833 bgcolor=#d6d6d6
| 332833 ||  || — || November 24, 2003 || Anderson Mesa || LONEOS || — || align=right | 3.6 km || 
|-id=834 bgcolor=#d6d6d6
| 332834 ||  || — || January 13, 2010 || Kachina || J. Hobart || — || align=right | 2.9 km || 
|-id=835 bgcolor=#d6d6d6
| 332835 ||  || — || January 11, 2010 || Kitt Peak || Spacewatch || ALA || align=right | 5.7 km || 
|-id=836 bgcolor=#E9E9E9
| 332836 ||  || — || December 8, 2004 || Socorro || LINEAR || WIT || align=right | 1.6 km || 
|-id=837 bgcolor=#E9E9E9
| 332837 ||  || — || January 6, 2010 || Socorro || LINEAR || EUN || align=right | 1.6 km || 
|-id=838 bgcolor=#d6d6d6
| 332838 ||  || — || January 13, 2010 || Desert Moon || B. L. Stevens || — || align=right | 3.6 km || 
|-id=839 bgcolor=#d6d6d6
| 332839 ||  || — || February 12, 2010 || Socorro || LINEAR || — || align=right | 5.5 km || 
|-id=840 bgcolor=#d6d6d6
| 332840 ||  || — || February 25, 2010 || WISE || WISE || — || align=right | 3.4 km || 
|-id=841 bgcolor=#E9E9E9
| 332841 ||  || — || March 2, 2010 || WISE || WISE || slow || align=right | 3.3 km || 
|-id=842 bgcolor=#E9E9E9
| 332842 ||  || — || October 23, 2008 || Kitt Peak || Spacewatch || — || align=right | 1.2 km || 
|-id=843 bgcolor=#d6d6d6
| 332843 ||  || — || February 12, 2004 || Kitt Peak || Spacewatch || — || align=right | 3.8 km || 
|-id=844 bgcolor=#E9E9E9
| 332844 ||  || — || March 13, 2010 || La Sagra || OAM Obs. || — || align=right | 1.4 km || 
|-id=845 bgcolor=#E9E9E9
| 332845 ||  || — || March 19, 2001 || Kitt Peak || Spacewatch || — || align=right | 1.8 km || 
|-id=846 bgcolor=#E9E9E9
| 332846 ||  || — || December 12, 2004 || Kitt Peak || Spacewatch || — || align=right | 1.8 km || 
|-id=847 bgcolor=#E9E9E9
| 332847 ||  || — || December 20, 2004 || Mount Lemmon || Mount Lemmon Survey || — || align=right | 2.8 km || 
|-id=848 bgcolor=#fefefe
| 332848 ||  || — || September 18, 2007 || Anderson Mesa || LONEOS || V || align=right data-sort-value="0.89" | 890 m || 
|-id=849 bgcolor=#d6d6d6
| 332849 ||  || — || June 23, 2002 || La Palma || A. Fitzsimmons || — || align=right | 4.0 km || 
|-id=850 bgcolor=#E9E9E9
| 332850 ||  || — || April 6, 2005 || Kitt Peak || Spacewatch || GEF || align=right | 1.3 km || 
|-id=851 bgcolor=#E9E9E9
| 332851 ||  || — || January 13, 2005 || Kitt Peak || Spacewatch || NEM || align=right | 2.8 km || 
|-id=852 bgcolor=#E9E9E9
| 332852 ||  || — || September 1, 2010 || Bergisch Gladbac || W. Bickel || — || align=right | 1.2 km || 
|-id=853 bgcolor=#fefefe
| 332853 ||  || — || December 17, 2003 || Kitt Peak || Spacewatch || V || align=right data-sort-value="0.79" | 790 m || 
|-id=854 bgcolor=#fefefe
| 332854 ||  || — || March 8, 2005 || Mount Lemmon || Mount Lemmon Survey || FLO || align=right data-sort-value="0.70" | 700 m || 
|-id=855 bgcolor=#fefefe
| 332855 ||  || — || May 4, 2005 || Mauna Kea || C. Veillet || — || align=right data-sort-value="0.64" | 640 m || 
|-id=856 bgcolor=#fefefe
| 332856 ||  || — || February 3, 2009 || Mount Lemmon || Mount Lemmon Survey || FLO || align=right data-sort-value="0.67" | 670 m || 
|-id=857 bgcolor=#fefefe
| 332857 ||  || — || September 24, 2003 || Palomar || NEAT || V || align=right data-sort-value="0.94" | 940 m || 
|-id=858 bgcolor=#fefefe
| 332858 ||  || — || September 28, 2006 || Catalina || CSS || PHO || align=right | 1.3 km || 
|-id=859 bgcolor=#E9E9E9
| 332859 ||  || — || March 18, 2004 || Kitt Peak || Spacewatch || — || align=right | 1.4 km || 
|-id=860 bgcolor=#fefefe
| 332860 ||  || — || December 17, 2007 || Mount Lemmon || Mount Lemmon Survey || FLO || align=right data-sort-value="0.64" | 640 m || 
|-id=861 bgcolor=#E9E9E9
| 332861 ||  || — || February 16, 2007 || Catalina || CSS || — || align=right | 2.3 km || 
|-id=862 bgcolor=#fefefe
| 332862 ||  || — || November 29, 2003 || Kitt Peak || Spacewatch || — || align=right data-sort-value="0.73" | 730 m || 
|-id=863 bgcolor=#E9E9E9
| 332863 ||  || — || October 14, 2010 || Mount Lemmon || Mount Lemmon Survey || HEN || align=right | 1.1 km || 
|-id=864 bgcolor=#E9E9E9
| 332864 ||  || — || November 11, 2010 || Mount Lemmon || Mount Lemmon Survey || — || align=right | 1.6 km || 
|-id=865 bgcolor=#fefefe
| 332865 ||  || — || October 4, 2002 || Apache Point || SDSS || V || align=right data-sort-value="0.86" | 860 m || 
|-id=866 bgcolor=#fefefe
| 332866 ||  || — || February 7, 1999 || Kitt Peak || Spacewatch || — || align=right data-sort-value="0.69" | 690 m || 
|-id=867 bgcolor=#fefefe
| 332867 ||  || — || September 22, 2003 || Kitt Peak || Spacewatch || — || align=right data-sort-value="0.83" | 830 m || 
|-id=868 bgcolor=#fefefe
| 332868 ||  || — || November 19, 2003 || Kitt Peak || Spacewatch || FLO || align=right data-sort-value="0.64" | 640 m || 
|-id=869 bgcolor=#fefefe
| 332869 ||  || — || September 28, 2006 || Kitt Peak || Spacewatch || — || align=right | 1.0 km || 
|-id=870 bgcolor=#E9E9E9
| 332870 ||  || — || November 8, 2010 || Mount Lemmon || Mount Lemmon Survey || — || align=right | 1.3 km || 
|-id=871 bgcolor=#fefefe
| 332871 ||  || — || November 27, 2000 || Socorro || LINEAR || FLO || align=right data-sort-value="0.66" | 660 m || 
|-id=872 bgcolor=#d6d6d6
| 332872 ||  || — || January 24, 2006 || Anderson Mesa || LONEOS || — || align=right | 3.0 km || 
|-id=873 bgcolor=#fefefe
| 332873 ||  || — || October 2, 2006 || Mount Lemmon || Mount Lemmon Survey || — || align=right data-sort-value="0.90" | 900 m || 
|-id=874 bgcolor=#fefefe
| 332874 ||  || — || November 26, 2003 || Kitt Peak || Spacewatch || — || align=right data-sort-value="0.99" | 990 m || 
|-id=875 bgcolor=#E9E9E9
| 332875 ||  || — || December 7, 2005 || Catalina || CSS || — || align=right | 2.8 km || 
|-id=876 bgcolor=#E9E9E9
| 332876 ||  || — || February 22, 2007 || Kitt Peak || Spacewatch || MIS || align=right | 2.6 km || 
|-id=877 bgcolor=#fefefe
| 332877 ||  || — || September 17, 2004 || Anderson Mesa || LONEOS || H || align=right | 1.0 km || 
|-id=878 bgcolor=#fefefe
| 332878 ||  || — || May 1, 2008 || Siding Spring || SSS || — || align=right | 1.4 km || 
|-id=879 bgcolor=#E9E9E9
| 332879 ||  || — || December 27, 2006 || Mount Lemmon || Mount Lemmon Survey || — || align=right | 1.1 km || 
|-id=880 bgcolor=#fefefe
| 332880 ||  || — || November 17, 2006 || Mount Lemmon || Mount Lemmon Survey || SUL || align=right | 1.9 km || 
|-id=881 bgcolor=#E9E9E9
| 332881 ||  || — || October 26, 2005 || Kitt Peak || Spacewatch || — || align=right | 1.5 km || 
|-id=882 bgcolor=#E9E9E9
| 332882 ||  || — || January 17, 2007 || Kitt Peak || Spacewatch || MAR || align=right | 1.2 km || 
|-id=883 bgcolor=#E9E9E9
| 332883 ||  || — || January 12, 2011 || Mount Lemmon || Mount Lemmon Survey || CLO || align=right | 3.0 km || 
|-id=884 bgcolor=#E9E9E9
| 332884 ||  || — || February 12, 2010 || WISE || WISE || — || align=right | 1.4 km || 
|-id=885 bgcolor=#E9E9E9
| 332885 ||  || — || December 1, 2005 || Kitt Peak || Spacewatch || NEM || align=right | 2.7 km || 
|-id=886 bgcolor=#fefefe
| 332886 ||  || — || February 9, 2008 || Mount Lemmon || Mount Lemmon Survey || FLO || align=right data-sort-value="0.69" | 690 m || 
|-id=887 bgcolor=#E9E9E9
| 332887 ||  || — || March 15, 2007 || Bergisch Gladbac || W. Bickel || AEO || align=right | 1.1 km || 
|-id=888 bgcolor=#E9E9E9
| 332888 ||  || — || February 26, 2007 || Mount Lemmon || Mount Lemmon Survey || — || align=right | 1.8 km || 
|-id=889 bgcolor=#d6d6d6
| 332889 ||  || — || September 16, 2009 || Catalina || CSS || EOS || align=right | 2.5 km || 
|-id=890 bgcolor=#E9E9E9
| 332890 ||  || — || June 3, 2008 || Mount Lemmon || Mount Lemmon Survey || — || align=right | 3.0 km || 
|-id=891 bgcolor=#E9E9E9
| 332891 ||  || — || March 20, 1999 || Apache Point || SDSS || — || align=right | 1.1 km || 
|-id=892 bgcolor=#fefefe
| 332892 ||  || — || August 5, 2005 || Palomar || NEAT || — || align=right | 1.2 km || 
|-id=893 bgcolor=#d6d6d6
| 332893 ||  || — || April 2, 2006 || Anderson Mesa || LONEOS || — || align=right | 3.2 km || 
|-id=894 bgcolor=#E9E9E9
| 332894 ||  || — || March 10, 2002 || Haleakala || NEAT || — || align=right | 3.5 km || 
|-id=895 bgcolor=#fefefe
| 332895 ||  || — || January 8, 2011 || Mount Lemmon || Mount Lemmon Survey || — || align=right | 1.1 km || 
|-id=896 bgcolor=#E9E9E9
| 332896 ||  || — || March 20, 2007 || Catalina || CSS || — || align=right | 3.4 km || 
|-id=897 bgcolor=#E9E9E9
| 332897 ||  || — || January 24, 2007 || Bergisch Gladbac || W. Bickel || — || align=right | 1.5 km || 
|-id=898 bgcolor=#E9E9E9
| 332898 ||  || — || February 27, 2007 || Kitt Peak || Spacewatch || — || align=right | 1.5 km || 
|-id=899 bgcolor=#E9E9E9
| 332899 ||  || — || October 2, 2009 || Mount Lemmon || Mount Lemmon Survey || MAR || align=right | 1.6 km || 
|-id=900 bgcolor=#d6d6d6
| 332900 ||  || — || December 25, 2005 || Mount Lemmon || Mount Lemmon Survey || — || align=right | 2.5 km || 
|}

332901–333000 

|-bgcolor=#d6d6d6
| 332901 ||  || — || February 22, 2006 || Catalina || CSS || EOS || align=right | 2.5 km || 
|-id=902 bgcolor=#E9E9E9
| 332902 ||  || — || March 26, 2003 || Palomar || NEAT || — || align=right | 2.1 km || 
|-id=903 bgcolor=#E9E9E9
| 332903 ||  || — || November 1, 2005 || Palomar || NEAT || — || align=right | 1.7 km || 
|-id=904 bgcolor=#E9E9E9
| 332904 ||  || — || March 26, 2003 || Palomar || NEAT || — || align=right | 1.9 km || 
|-id=905 bgcolor=#E9E9E9
| 332905 ||  || — || December 14, 2010 || Mount Lemmon || Mount Lemmon Survey || — || align=right | 1.4 km || 
|-id=906 bgcolor=#fefefe
| 332906 ||  || — || February 22, 2004 || Kitt Peak || Spacewatch || — || align=right | 2.9 km || 
|-id=907 bgcolor=#fefefe
| 332907 ||  || — || May 17, 2004 || Reedy Creek || J. Broughton || MAS || align=right data-sort-value="0.98" | 980 m || 
|-id=908 bgcolor=#fefefe
| 332908 ||  || — || September 19, 1998 || Apache Point || SDSS || MAS || align=right data-sort-value="0.73" | 730 m || 
|-id=909 bgcolor=#E9E9E9
| 332909 ||  || — || September 18, 1995 || Kitt Peak || Spacewatch || — || align=right | 2.7 km || 
|-id=910 bgcolor=#fefefe
| 332910 ||  || — || September 22, 2009 || Catalina || CSS || — || align=right | 1.3 km || 
|-id=911 bgcolor=#fefefe
| 332911 ||  || — || October 29, 2003 || Kitt Peak || Spacewatch || — || align=right data-sort-value="0.97" | 970 m || 
|-id=912 bgcolor=#d6d6d6
| 332912 ||  || — || September 20, 2008 || Mount Lemmon || Mount Lemmon Survey || HYG || align=right | 2.7 km || 
|-id=913 bgcolor=#d6d6d6
| 332913 ||  || — || March 2, 2006 || Kitt Peak || Spacewatch || — || align=right | 2.5 km || 
|-id=914 bgcolor=#E9E9E9
| 332914 ||  || — || September 2, 2000 || Anderson Mesa || LONEOS || EUN || align=right | 1.3 km || 
|-id=915 bgcolor=#d6d6d6
| 332915 ||  || — || March 26, 2006 || Kitt Peak || Spacewatch || — || align=right | 2.3 km || 
|-id=916 bgcolor=#E9E9E9
| 332916 ||  || — || September 17, 2004 || Kitt Peak || Spacewatch || — || align=right | 1.8 km || 
|-id=917 bgcolor=#E9E9E9
| 332917 ||  || — || December 25, 2005 || Kitt Peak || Spacewatch || — || align=right | 2.9 km || 
|-id=918 bgcolor=#d6d6d6
| 332918 ||  || — || October 23, 2003 || Apache Point || SDSS || — || align=right | 3.9 km || 
|-id=919 bgcolor=#E9E9E9
| 332919 ||  || — || September 16, 2009 || Catalina || CSS || — || align=right | 3.6 km || 
|-id=920 bgcolor=#fefefe
| 332920 ||  || — || March 31, 2008 || Mount Lemmon || Mount Lemmon Survey || V || align=right data-sort-value="0.66" | 660 m || 
|-id=921 bgcolor=#fefefe
| 332921 ||  || — || November 19, 2006 || Kitt Peak || Spacewatch || — || align=right | 1.0 km || 
|-id=922 bgcolor=#d6d6d6
| 332922 ||  || — || January 7, 2006 || Kitt Peak || Spacewatch || LUT || align=right | 6.1 km || 
|-id=923 bgcolor=#E9E9E9
| 332923 ||  || — || October 12, 2009 || Mount Lemmon || Mount Lemmon Survey || NEM || align=right | 2.8 km || 
|-id=924 bgcolor=#d6d6d6
| 332924 ||  || — || June 21, 2007 || Mount Lemmon || Mount Lemmon Survey || HYG || align=right | 2.9 km || 
|-id=925 bgcolor=#E9E9E9
| 332925 ||  || — || December 27, 2006 || Mount Lemmon || Mount Lemmon Survey || EUN || align=right | 1.4 km || 
|-id=926 bgcolor=#d6d6d6
| 332926 ||  || — || January 26, 2006 || Anderson Mesa || LONEOS || — || align=right | 3.3 km || 
|-id=927 bgcolor=#d6d6d6
| 332927 ||  || — || December 3, 2004 || Kitt Peak || Spacewatch || HYG || align=right | 3.1 km || 
|-id=928 bgcolor=#E9E9E9
| 332928 ||  || — || March 19, 2007 || Siding Spring || SSS || — || align=right | 2.7 km || 
|-id=929 bgcolor=#E9E9E9
| 332929 ||  || — || February 17, 2007 || Kitt Peak || Spacewatch || — || align=right | 1.7 km || 
|-id=930 bgcolor=#E9E9E9
| 332930 ||  || — || March 11, 2007 || Kitt Peak || Spacewatch || — || align=right | 2.5 km || 
|-id=931 bgcolor=#d6d6d6
| 332931 ||  || — || September 19, 1998 || Apache Point || SDSS || EOS || align=right | 2.6 km || 
|-id=932 bgcolor=#d6d6d6
| 332932 ||  || — || March 6, 2006 || Mount Lemmon || Mount Lemmon Survey || TIR || align=right | 3.1 km || 
|-id=933 bgcolor=#d6d6d6
| 332933 ||  || — || February 28, 2006 || Catalina || CSS || EOS || align=right | 2.6 km || 
|-id=934 bgcolor=#d6d6d6
| 332934 ||  || — || December 18, 2009 || Mount Lemmon || Mount Lemmon Survey || — || align=right | 4.4 km || 
|-id=935 bgcolor=#E9E9E9
| 332935 ||  || — || March 14, 2007 || Kitt Peak || Spacewatch || — || align=right | 2.1 km || 
|-id=936 bgcolor=#d6d6d6
| 332936 ||  || — || March 23, 2001 || Anderson Mesa || LONEOS || — || align=right | 3.6 km || 
|-id=937 bgcolor=#d6d6d6
| 332937 ||  || — || March 26, 2006 || Kitt Peak || Spacewatch || — || align=right | 3.0 km || 
|-id=938 bgcolor=#d6d6d6
| 332938 ||  || — || October 24, 2005 || Mauna Kea || A. Boattini || KOR || align=right | 1.4 km || 
|-id=939 bgcolor=#E9E9E9
| 332939 ||  || — || March 13, 2007 || Kitt Peak || Spacewatch || — || align=right | 2.0 km || 
|-id=940 bgcolor=#E9E9E9
| 332940 ||  || — || February 1, 2006 || Mount Lemmon || Mount Lemmon Survey || AGN || align=right | 1.3 km || 
|-id=941 bgcolor=#d6d6d6
| 332941 ||  || — || September 29, 2003 || Kitt Peak || Spacewatch || — || align=right | 3.1 km || 
|-id=942 bgcolor=#d6d6d6
| 332942 ||  || — || February 2, 2005 || Kitt Peak || Spacewatch || — || align=right | 4.2 km || 
|-id=943 bgcolor=#E9E9E9
| 332943 ||  || — || March 10, 2007 || Mount Lemmon || Mount Lemmon Survey || — || align=right | 2.3 km || 
|-id=944 bgcolor=#E9E9E9
| 332944 ||  || — || November 30, 2005 || Kitt Peak || Spacewatch || — || align=right | 2.5 km || 
|-id=945 bgcolor=#fefefe
| 332945 ||  || — || August 15, 2009 || Kitt Peak || Spacewatch || V || align=right data-sort-value="0.74" | 740 m || 
|-id=946 bgcolor=#E9E9E9
| 332946 ||  || — || December 26, 2006 || Kitt Peak || Spacewatch || — || align=right | 2.3 km || 
|-id=947 bgcolor=#d6d6d6
| 332947 ||  || — || February 7, 2006 || Mount Lemmon || Mount Lemmon Survey || — || align=right | 3.3 km || 
|-id=948 bgcolor=#d6d6d6
| 332948 ||  || — || March 3, 2006 || Kitt Peak || Spacewatch || — || align=right | 2.5 km || 
|-id=949 bgcolor=#d6d6d6
| 332949 ||  || — || June 16, 2006 || Kitt Peak || Spacewatch || — || align=right | 4.5 km || 
|-id=950 bgcolor=#d6d6d6
| 332950 ||  || — || September 28, 2003 || Kitt Peak || Spacewatch || — || align=right | 2.9 km || 
|-id=951 bgcolor=#E9E9E9
| 332951 ||  || — || August 5, 2008 || La Sagra || OAM Obs. || — || align=right | 2.1 km || 
|-id=952 bgcolor=#E9E9E9
| 332952 ||  || — || April 23, 2007 || Mount Lemmon || Mount Lemmon Survey || — || align=right | 2.1 km || 
|-id=953 bgcolor=#d6d6d6
| 332953 ||  || — || March 23, 2006 || Catalina || CSS || — || align=right | 4.4 km || 
|-id=954 bgcolor=#d6d6d6
| 332954 ||  || — || February 14, 2005 || Kitt Peak || Spacewatch || EOS || align=right | 2.3 km || 
|-id=955 bgcolor=#E9E9E9
| 332955 ||  || — || March 26, 2007 || Kitt Peak || Spacewatch || — || align=right | 1.6 km || 
|-id=956 bgcolor=#d6d6d6
| 332956 ||  || — || September 23, 2008 || Kitt Peak || Spacewatch || — || align=right | 3.5 km || 
|-id=957 bgcolor=#E9E9E9
| 332957 ||  || — || December 27, 2006 || Mount Lemmon || Mount Lemmon Survey || — || align=right | 2.1 km || 
|-id=958 bgcolor=#d6d6d6
| 332958 ||  || — || July 20, 2002 || Palomar || NEAT || — || align=right | 5.5 km || 
|-id=959 bgcolor=#d6d6d6
| 332959 ||  || — || March 5, 2006 || Catalina || CSS || — || align=right | 4.4 km || 
|-id=960 bgcolor=#fefefe
| 332960 ||  || — || November 6, 2002 || Anderson Mesa || LONEOS || — || align=right | 1.1 km || 
|-id=961 bgcolor=#d6d6d6
| 332961 ||  || — || April 4, 2006 || Lulin Observatory || Q.-z. Ye || EOS || align=right | 2.2 km || 
|-id=962 bgcolor=#d6d6d6
| 332962 ||  || — || April 2, 1995 || Kitt Peak || Spacewatch || — || align=right | 2.5 km || 
|-id=963 bgcolor=#d6d6d6
| 332963 ||  || — || June 18, 2007 || Kitt Peak || Spacewatch || EOS || align=right | 2.4 km || 
|-id=964 bgcolor=#d6d6d6
| 332964 ||  || — || October 9, 2008 || Catalina || CSS || — || align=right | 3.8 km || 
|-id=965 bgcolor=#d6d6d6
| 332965 ||  || — || May 7, 2006 || Mount Lemmon || Mount Lemmon Survey || — || align=right | 3.3 km || 
|-id=966 bgcolor=#d6d6d6
| 332966 ||  || — || November 16, 2003 || Kitt Peak || Spacewatch || — || align=right | 4.2 km || 
|-id=967 bgcolor=#d6d6d6
| 332967 ||  || — || September 26, 2008 || Kitt Peak || Spacewatch || — || align=right | 3.4 km || 
|-id=968 bgcolor=#E9E9E9
| 332968 ||  || — || March 31, 2003 || Anderson Mesa || LONEOS || — || align=right | 1.2 km || 
|-id=969 bgcolor=#d6d6d6
| 332969 ||  || — || August 31, 2002 || Kitt Peak || Spacewatch || VER || align=right | 3.3 km || 
|-id=970 bgcolor=#d6d6d6
| 332970 ||  || — || October 10, 2002 || Apache Point || SDSS || — || align=right | 3.1 km || 
|-id=971 bgcolor=#d6d6d6
| 332971 ||  || — || May 20, 2006 || Kitt Peak || Spacewatch || — || align=right | 2.9 km || 
|-id=972 bgcolor=#E9E9E9
| 332972 ||  || — || March 10, 2002 || Palomar || NEAT || GEF || align=right | 1.9 km || 
|-id=973 bgcolor=#d6d6d6
| 332973 ||  || — || January 26, 2006 || Kitt Peak || Spacewatch || BRA || align=right | 1.8 km || 
|-id=974 bgcolor=#fefefe
| 332974 ||  || — || March 2, 2001 || Anderson Mesa || LONEOS || — || align=right data-sort-value="0.91" | 910 m || 
|-id=975 bgcolor=#d6d6d6
| 332975 ||  || — || April 2, 2006 || Kitt Peak || Spacewatch || — || align=right | 3.8 km || 
|-id=976 bgcolor=#d6d6d6
| 332976 ||  || — || March 9, 2005 || Catalina || CSS || — || align=right | 4.8 km || 
|-id=977 bgcolor=#d6d6d6
| 332977 ||  || — || September 13, 2007 || Mount Lemmon || Mount Lemmon Survey || — || align=right | 3.4 km || 
|-id=978 bgcolor=#d6d6d6
| 332978 ||  || — || January 28, 2006 || Kitt Peak || Spacewatch || — || align=right | 3.4 km || 
|-id=979 bgcolor=#d6d6d6
| 332979 ||  || — || April 6, 2000 || Anderson Mesa || LONEOS || TIR || align=right | 3.5 km || 
|-id=980 bgcolor=#d6d6d6
| 332980 ||  || — || October 15, 2002 || Palomar || NEAT || — || align=right | 5.7 km || 
|-id=981 bgcolor=#d6d6d6
| 332981 ||  || — || October 10, 2002 || Apache Point || SDSS || — || align=right | 3.2 km || 
|-id=982 bgcolor=#d6d6d6
| 332982 ||  || — || September 11, 2002 || Palomar || NEAT || — || align=right | 3.9 km || 
|-id=983 bgcolor=#d6d6d6
| 332983 ||  || — || September 19, 1998 || Apache Point || SDSS || KOR || align=right | 1.8 km || 
|-id=984 bgcolor=#d6d6d6
| 332984 ||  || — || October 6, 2008 || Mount Lemmon || Mount Lemmon Survey || fast? || align=right | 4.3 km || 
|-id=985 bgcolor=#d6d6d6
| 332985 ||  || — || October 29, 2003 || Kitt Peak || Spacewatch || HYG || align=right | 2.8 km || 
|-id=986 bgcolor=#d6d6d6
| 332986 ||  || — || October 20, 2003 || Kitt Peak || Spacewatch || EOS || align=right | 2.0 km || 
|-id=987 bgcolor=#E9E9E9
| 332987 ||  || — || August 22, 2003 || Palomar || NEAT || — || align=right | 3.1 km || 
|-id=988 bgcolor=#d6d6d6
| 332988 ||  || — || August 17, 2002 || Haleakala || NEAT || — || align=right | 4.7 km || 
|-id=989 bgcolor=#d6d6d6
| 332989 ||  || — || November 19, 2003 || Kitt Peak || Spacewatch || VER || align=right | 3.8 km || 
|-id=990 bgcolor=#fefefe
| 332990 ||  || — || April 14, 2004 || Kitt Peak || Spacewatch || MAS || align=right data-sort-value="0.75" | 750 m || 
|-id=991 bgcolor=#d6d6d6
| 332991 ||  || — || January 28, 2006 || Mount Lemmon || Mount Lemmon Survey || — || align=right | 3.0 km || 
|-id=992 bgcolor=#d6d6d6
| 332992 ||  || — || March 17, 2005 || Kitt Peak || Spacewatch || — || align=right | 3.5 km || 
|-id=993 bgcolor=#d6d6d6
| 332993 ||  || — || October 24, 2005 || Mauna Kea || A. Boattini || — || align=right | 3.2 km || 
|-id=994 bgcolor=#d6d6d6
| 332994 ||  || — || March 10, 2005 || Anderson Mesa || LONEOS || ALA || align=right | 4.9 km || 
|-id=995 bgcolor=#d6d6d6
| 332995 ||  || — || May 28, 2000 || Socorro || LINEAR || URS || align=right | 5.0 km || 
|-id=996 bgcolor=#d6d6d6
| 332996 ||  || — || December 20, 2009 || Kitt Peak || Spacewatch || VER || align=right | 2.5 km || 
|-id=997 bgcolor=#d6d6d6
| 332997 ||  || — || November 19, 2003 || Kitt Peak || Spacewatch || — || align=right | 4.1 km || 
|-id=998 bgcolor=#d6d6d6
| 332998 ||  || — || January 8, 2010 || Kitt Peak || Spacewatch || URS || align=right | 4.8 km || 
|-id=999 bgcolor=#d6d6d6
| 332999 ||  || — || December 16, 2003 || Kitt Peak || Spacewatch || EOS || align=right | 2.3 km || 
|-id=000 bgcolor=#d6d6d6
| 333000 ||  || — || August 5, 2002 || Palomar || NEAT || — || align=right | 3.4 km || 
|}

References

External links 
 Discovery Circumstances: Numbered Minor Planets (330001)–(335000) (IAU Minor Planet Center)

0332